

Deaths in October

24: Bill Chadwick
20: Yuri Ryazanov

Current sporting seasons

American football 2009

NFL
NCAA Division I FBS

Auto racing 2009

Formula One
Sprint Cup (Chase)

Formula Two
Nationwide Series
Camping World Truck Series

WTTC
V8 Supercar

Superleague Formula

Super GT

Baseball 2009

Major League Baseball

Nippon Professional Baseball

Basketball 2009

NBA

Euroleague
Eurocup

ASEAN Basketball League
Australia
France
Germany
Greece
Iran
Israel
Italy
Philippines
Philippine Cup
Russia
Spain
Turkey

Canadian football 2009

Canadian Football League

Football (soccer) 2009

National teams competitions
2010 FIFA World Cup Qualifying
2011 FIFA Women's World Cup qualification (UEFA)
International clubs competitions
UEFA (Europe) Champions League
Europa League
UEFA Women's Champions League

Copa Sudamericana
AFC (Asia) Champions League
AFC Cup
CAF (Africa) Champions League
CAF Confederation Cup
CONCACAF (North & Central America) Champions League

Domestic (national) competitions
Argentina
Australia
Brazil
England
France
Germany
Iran
Italy
Japan
Norway
Russia
Scotland
Spain
Major League Soccer (USA & Canada)
Playoffs

Golf 2009

European Tour
PGA Tour
LPGA Tour
Champions Tour

Ice hockey 2009

National Hockey League

Motorcycle racing 2009

Moto GP

Rugby league 2009

Four Nations
European Cup
Pacific Cup

Rugby union 2009

Heineken Cup
European Challenge Cup
English Premiership
Celtic League
Top 14

Currie Cup
Air New Zealand Cup

Winter sports

Alpine Skiing World Cup

Grand Prix of Figure Skating

Days of the month

October 31, 2009 (Saturday)

American football
NCAA:
BCS Top 10 (unbeaten teams in bold):
Florida vs. Georgia Football Classic in Jacksonville, Florida: (1) Florida 41, Georgia 17
(3) Texas 41, (14) Oklahoma State 14
(4) Iowa 42, Indiana 24
 (10) Oregon 47, (5) USC 20
(6) TCU 41, UNLV 0
(7) Boise State 45, San Jose State 7
(8) Cincinnati 28, Syracuse 7
  (9) LSU 42, Tulane 0
Idle: (2) Alabama
 Other games:
 Tennessee 31, (22) South Carolina 13
 Auburn 33, (25) Mississippi 20

Baseball
Major League Baseball postseason:
World Series:
Game 3: New York Yankees 8, Philadelphia Phillies 5. Yankees lead best-of-7 series 2–1.
Nippon Professional Baseball postseason:
Japan Series:
Game 1, Yomiuri Giants 4, Hokkaido Nippon-Ham Fighters 3. Giants lead best-of-7 series 1–0.

Canadian football
Canadian Interuniversity Sport (CIS Top Ten rankings in parentheses):
 Ontario University Athletics quarterfinals:
 (5) Western Ontario Mustangs 37, Guelph Gryphons 16
 Western advances to play the Wilfrid Laurier Golden Hawks next week in one OUA semifinal on the back of Mustangs QB Michael Faulds' performance.
 (10) McMaster Marauders 27, (7) Ottawa Gee-Gees 15
 Though McMaster is the first team in OUA history to have a road playoff game despite a 6–2 regular season record (due to a four-way tie for second at 6–2), the Marauders earn a trip to Queen's University to play the Gaels next week.

Cricket
Australia in India:
3rd ODI in Delhi:
 229/5 (50 ov);  230/4 (48.2 ov). India win by 6 wickets, lead the 7-match series 2–1.
Zimbabwe in Bangladesh:
3rd ODI in Mirpur:
 196 (41.1 ov);  198/6 (40.4 ov). Bangladesh win by 4 wickets, lead the 5-match series 2–1.

Figure skating
ISU Grand Prix:
Cup of China in Beijing, China: (skaters in bold qualify for the Grand Prix Final)
Ladies:  Akiko Suzuki  176.66  Kiira Korpi  163.27  Joannie Rochette  163.18
Men:  Nobunari Oda  239.58  Evan Lysacek  232.17  Sergei Voronov  220.39
Pairs:  Xue Shen/Hongbo Zhao  200.97  Zhang Dan/Zhang Hao  186.49  Tatiana Volosozhar/Stanislav Morozov  170.79
Ice Dancing:  Tanith Belbin/Benjamin Agosto  194.51  Jana Khokhlova/Sergei Novitski  180.57  Federica Faiella/Massimo Scali  179.92

Football (soccer)
U-17 World Cup in Nigeria: (teams in bold advance to the round of 16)
Group C:
 2–2 
 0–1 
Final standings: Iran 7 points, Colombia 5, Netherlands 3, Gambia 1.
Group D:
 4–1 
 1–1 
Final standings: Turkey 7 points, Burkina Faso 4, New Zealand 3, Costa Rica 1.
 Finnish Cup Final in Helsinki:
Tampere United 1–2 Inter Turku
Inter Turku win the Cup for the first time.
 MLS Cup Playoffs:
Conference Semifinals, first leg:
Real Salt Lake 1, Columbus Crew 0

Golf
PGA Tour:
 The Viking Classic in Madison, Mississippi is canceled because of unplayable course conditions, making it the first PGA Tour event to be called off due to weather since 1996. Nearly 2 inches (5 cm) of overnight rain compounded the problems on a course that had already received nearly 20 inches (50 cm) of rain in the previous six weeks.

Rugby league
Four Nations:
Round 2:
 16–26 
 12–62 
Standings: New Zealand, Australia 3 points, England 2, France 0.
Pacific Cup:
Third place Playoff in Port Moresby:
  26–16

Rugby union
End of year tests:
 19–32  in Tokyo
The All Blacks complete a 4–0 sweep in the Bledisloe Cup series and retain the Cup for the seventh straight year.
Currie Cup Final in Pretoria:
Blue Bulls 36–24 Free State Cheetahs
Air New Zealand Cup Finals:
Semifinal 2 in Wellington:
Wellington 34–21 Southland
Heartland Championship:
Meads Cup Final in Christchurch:
Mid Canterbury 13–34 Wanganui
Lochore Cup Final in Greymouth:
West Coast 13–21 North Otago

Tennis
WTA Tour:
WTA Tour Championships in Doha, Qatar:
Semifinals:
(2) Serena Williams  def. (4) Caroline Wozniacki  6–4 0–1 (retired)
(7) Venus Williams  def. (8) Jelena Janković  5–7 6–3 6–4

October 30, 2009 (Friday)

American football
NCAA BCS Top 25
South Florida 30, (21) West Virginia 19

Figure skating
ISU Grand Prix:
Cup of China in Beijing, China:
Ladies – Short Program: (1) Mirai Nagasu  62.20 (2) Kiira Korpi  61.20 (3) Carolina Kostner  61.12
Men – Short Program: (1) Nobunari Oda  83.35 (2) Sergei Voronov  81.40 (3) Evan Lysacek  80.80
Pairs – Short Program: (1) Shen Xue/Zhao Hongbo  72.28 (2) Tatiana Volosozhar/Stanislav Morozov  62.98 (3) Lubov Iliushechkina/Nodari Maisuradze  62.54
This is the first competition for Shen and Zhao since they won the 2007 World Championships.
Ice Dancing – after Compulsory and Original Dance: (1) Tanith Belbin/Benjamin Agosto  98.66 (2) Jana Khokhlova/Sergei Novitski  92.78 (3) Federica Faiella/Massimo Scali  89.96

Football (soccer)
U-17 World Cup in Nigeria: (teams in bold advance to the round of 16)
Group A:
 3–1 
 1–2 
Final standings: Nigeria 7 points, Argentina 6, Germany 4, Honduras 0.
Group B:
 0–2 
 1–0 
Final standings: Switzerland 9 points, Mexico 6, Brazil 3, Japan 0.

Rugby union
Air New Zealand Cup Finals:
Semifinal 1 in Christchurch:
Canterbury 20–3 Hawke's Bay

Tennis
WTA Tour:
WTA Tour Championships in Doha, Qatar: (players in bold advance to the semifinals)
White Group:
(8) Jelena Janković  def. (4) Caroline Wozniacki  6–2 6–2
Agnieszka Radwańska  def. (6) Victoria Azarenka  4–6 7–5 4–1 (retired)
Final standings: Janković, Wozniacki 2 wins, Radwańska, Azarenka 1 win.
Maroon Group:
(3) Svetlana Kuznetsova  def. (5) Elena Dementieva  6–3 6–2
Final standings: Serena Williams 3 wins, Venus Williams, Kuznetsova, Dementieva 1 win.

October 29, 2009 (Thursday)

American football
NCAA BCS Top 25
 North Carolina 20, (13) Virginia Tech 17
 The Tar Heels spring the upset in Blacksburg with Casey Barth's 21-yard field goal as time expires.

Baseball
Major League Baseball postseason:
World Series:
Game 2: New York Yankees 3, Philadelphia Phillies 1. Best-of-7 series tied 1–1.

Basketball
Euroleague:
Regular Season Game 2: (unbeaten teams in bold)
Group A:
Montepaschi Siena  84–64  Žalgiris
Regal FC Barcelona  81–59  Cibona
Group B:
Efes Pilsen  77–67  Partizan
Orléans  62–69  Lietuvos Rytas
Group C:
Caja Laboral Baskonia  86–81  Maccabi Tel Aviv
Union Olimpija Ljubljana  75–81  Maroussi
Group D:
Panathinaikos  101–66  Khimki

Cricket
Zimbabwe in Bangladesh:
2nd ODI in Mirpur:
 219 (47.2 ov);  221/3 (29.3 ov, Shakib Al Hasan 105*). Bangladesh win by 7 wickets. 5-match series level 1–1.

Football (soccer)
U-17 World Cup in Nigeria: (teams in bold advance to the round of 16)
Group D:
 4–1 
Standings: Turkey 6 points, New Zealand 2, Burkina Faso, Costa Rica 1.
Group E:
 1–0 
 1–3 
Standings: Spain 6 points, UAE, USA 3, Malawi 0.
Group F:
 2–1  Korea Republic
 2–0 
Standings: Italy 6 points, Korea, Uruguay 3, Algeria 0.
2011 FIFA Women's World Cup qualification (UEFA):
Group 2:  13–1 
Standings: Norway 6 points (2 matches), Netherlands, Slovakia 3 (2), Belarus 3 (1).
Group 3:  3–1 
Standings: Denmark 7 points (3 matches), Scotland 6 (2), Greece 3 (3).
Group 4:  0–4 
Standings: Poland 9 points (4 matches), Hungary 7 (3), Romania 4 (3), Ukraine 3 (2).
Group 5:  0–1 
Standings: Spain 9 points (3 matches), England 3 (1).
Group 6:  1–2 
Standings: Russia 6 points (2 matches), Switzerland 6 (3), Ireland 6 (4), Israel 3 (2).
Women's international friendly:
 0–1  in Augsburg
 MLS Cup Playoffs:
Conference Semifinals, first leg:
Seattle Sounders FC 0, Houston Dynamo 0

Snooker
Premier League Snooker – League phase in Preston, Lancashire:
John Higgins 4–2 Neil Robertson
Shaun Murphy 3–3 Stephen Hendry
Standings: Ronnie O'Sullivan, John Higgins 6 points; Stephen Hendry 5; Judd Trump 4; Neil Robertson, Shaun Murphy 3; Marco Fu 1.

Tennis
WTA Tour:
WTA Tour Championships in Doha, Qatar: (players in bold advance to the semifinals)
White Group:
(4) Caroline Wozniacki  def. (ALT) Vera Zvonareva  6–0 6–7(3) 6–4
Maroon Group:
(2) Serena Williams  def. (5) Elena Dementieva  6–2 6–4
(7) Venus Williams  def. (3) Svetlana Kuznetsova  6–2 6–7(3) 6–4

October 28, 2009 (Wednesday)

Baseball
Major League Baseball postseason:
World Series:
Game 1: Philadelphia Phillies 6, New York Yankees 1. Phillies lead best-of-7 series 1–0.
 Two home runs from Chase Utley stake the Phils to a lead, and Cliff Lee throws a 10-strikeout, no-walk complete game without giving up an earned run, a feat never before accomplished in the World Series.

Basketball
Euroleague:
Regular Season Game 2: (unbeaten teams in bold)
Group A:
ASVEL Villeurbanne  76–78 (OT)  Fenerbahçe Ülker
Group B:
Unicaja Málaga  86–68  Olympiacos
Group C:
CSKA Moscow  69–72  Lottomatica Roma
Group D:
EWE Baskets Oldenburg  70–79  Armani Jeans Milano
Real Madrid  94–72  Asseco Prokom Gdynia

Cricket
Australia in India:
2nd ODI in Nagpur:
 354/7 (50 ov, Mahendra Singh Dhoni 124);  255 (48.3 ov). India win by 99 runs. 7-match series level 1–1.

Football (soccer)
U-17 World Cup in Nigeria: (teams in bold advance to the round of 16)
Group C:
 2–1 
 0–0 
Standings: Iran, Colombia 4 points, Netherlands 3, Gambia 0.
Group D:
 1–1 
 0–0  suspended after 21 minutes.
Standings: Turkey 3 points (1 match), New Zealand 2 (2), Costa Rica 1 (1), Burkina Faso 1 (2).
AFC Champions League Semi-finals, second leg: (first leg score in parentheses)
Nagoya Grampus  1–2 (2–6)  Al-Ittihad. Al-Ittihad win 8–3 on aggregate.
Umm-Salal  1–2 (0–2)  Pohang Steelers. Pohang Steelers win 4–1 on aggregate.
2011 FIFA Women's World Cup qualification (UEFA):
Group 1:
 12–0 
Sandrine Soubeyrand becomes the most-capped French player, man or woman, with 143 matches.
 0–1 
Standings: France 9 points (3 matches), Iceland 9 (4), Northern Ireland 3 (2).
Group 2:  1–0 
Standings: Norway 6 points (2 matches), Slovakia 3 (2), Belarus 3 (1).
Group 3:  0–0 
Standings: Denmark 7 points (3 matches), Scotland 3 (1), Greece 3 (3).
Group 4:  1–1 
Standings: Hungary 7 points (3 matches), Poland 6 (3), Romania 4 (3), Ukraine 3 (2).
Group 6:  1–2 
Standings: Russia 6 points (2 matches), Switzerland 6 (3), Israel 3 (2), Ireland 3 (3).
Group 7:
 1–5 
 0–1 
Standings: Italy, Finland 9 points (3 matches), Slovenia 3 (3).
Group 8:
 2–1 
 1–4 
Standings: Sweden 9 points (3 matches), Czech Republic, Azerbaijan 3 (2), Belgium 3 (3), Wales 3 (4).

Shooting
World Cup Final (rifle and pistol) in Wuxi, China:
Women's 10 metre air pistol:
Men's 10 metre air pistol:
Men's 50 metre rifle three positions:

Tennis
WTA Tour:
WTA Tour Championships in Doha, Qatar:
White Group:
(4) Caroline Wozniacki  def. (6) Victoria Azarenka  1–6 6–4 7–5
(8) Jelena Janković  def. (1) Dinara Safina  1–1 retired
Safina withdraws from the tournament due to a serious back injury, and will be replaced by Vera Zvonareva. Safina's withdrawal means that Serena Williams will finish the 2009 season as the WTA's #1-ranked player.
Maroon Group:
(2) Serena Williams  def. (7) Venus Williams  5–7 6–4 7–6(4)
Other news:
In excerpts from his upcoming autobiography published by The Times and Sports Illustrated, former great Andre Agassi admits to having used methamphetamine in 1997 and lying to the Association of Tennis Professionals to avoid a suspension after testing positive for the drug in the same year. (AP via ESPN)

October 27, 2009 (Tuesday)

Basketball
NBA season opening day:
Boston Celtics 95, Cleveland Cavaliers 89
Washington Wizards 102, Dallas Mavericks 91
Portland Trail Blazers 96, Houston Rockets 87
Los Angeles Lakers 99, Los Angeles Clippers 92

Cricket
Zimbabwe in Bangladesh:
1st ODI in Mirpur:
 186 (46.5 ov);  189/5 (34.4 ov). Zimbabwe win by 5 wickets, lead the 5-match series 1–0.

Football (soccer)
U-17 World Cup in Nigeria: (teams in bold advance to the round of 16)
Group A:
 2–1 
 1–0 
Standings: Argentina 6 points, Nigeria 4, Germany 1, Honduras 0.
Group B:
 4–3 
 0–1 
Standings: Switzerland 6 points, Brazil, Mexico 3, Japan 0.

Shooting
World Cup Final (rifle and pistol) in Wuxi, China:
Men's 50 metre rifle prone:
Women's 50 metre rifle three positions:
Women's 25 metre pistol:

Tennis
WTA Tour:
WTA Tour Championships in Doha, Qatar:
White Group:
(6) Victoria Azarenka  def. (8) Jelena Janković  6–2, 6–3
Maroon Group:
(5) Elena Dementieva  def. (7) Venus Williams  3–6, 7–6(6), 6–2
(2) Serena Williams  def. (3) Svetlana Kuznetsova  7–6(6), 7–5

October 26, 2009 (Monday)

American football
NFL Week 7:
Monday Night Football: Philadelphia Eagles 27, Washington Redskins 17

Football (soccer)
U-17 World Cup in Nigeria:
Group E:
 2–0 
 2–1 
Group F:
 1–3 
 0–1

Shooting
World Cup Final (rifle and pistol) in Wuxi, China:
Women's 10 metre air rifle:  Wu Liuxi  503.5 (400 EWR)  Yin Wen  503.0 (399)  Lioubov Galkina  500.0 (399)
Men's 10 metre air rifle:  Zhu Qinan  701.7 (598)  Péter Sidi  700.5 (599)  Henri Häkkinen  698.6 (595)
Men's 50 metre pistol:  Jin Jong-oh  671.8 (575)  João Costa  658.5 (564)  Pavol Kopp  656.6 (560)
Men's 25 metre rapid fire pistol:  Aleksey Klimov  783.6 (582)  Christian Reitz  780.9 (583)  Teruyoshi Akiyama  779.1 (580)

October 25, 2009 (Sunday)

American football
NFL Week 7 (unbeaten teams in bold):
 NFL International Series in London: New England Patriots 35, Tampa Bay Buccaneers 7
Indianapolis Colts 42, St. Louis Rams 6
San Diego Chargers 37, Kansas City Chiefs 7
Green Bay Packers 31, Cleveland Browns 3
Houston Texans 24, San Francisco 49ers 21
Pittsburgh Steelers 27, Minnesota Vikings 17
The Steelers return a fumble and a Brett Favre interception for touchdowns to hand the Vikings their first loss.
Buffalo Bills 20, Carolina Panthers 9
New York Jets 38, Oakland Raiders 0
Dallas Cowboys 37, Atlanta Falcons 21
Cincinnati Bengals 45, Chicago Bears 10
New Orleans Saints 46, Miami Dolphins 34
The Saints rally from a 21-point deficit in the second quarter to score their sixth straight win.
Sunday Night Football: Arizona Cardinals 24, New York Giants 17
Bye week: Baltimore Ravens, Denver Broncos, Detroit Lions, Jacksonville Jaguars, Seattle Seahawks, Tennessee Titans

Alpine skiing
World Cup:
Men's GS in Sölden, Austria:
 Didier Cuche  2:21.45  Ted Ligety   2:22.05  Carlo Janka  2:22.40

Auto racing
Chase for the Sprint Cup:
TUMS Fast Relief 500 in Ridgeway, Virginia: (1) Denny Hamlin  (Toyota, Joe Gibbs Racing) (2) Jimmie Johnson  (Chevrolet, Hendrick Motorsports) (3) Juan Pablo Montoya  (Chevrolet, Earnhardt Ganassi Racing)
Drivers' standings (with 4 races remaining): (1) Johnson 6098 points (2) Mark Martin  (Chevrolet, Hendrick Motorsports) 5980 (−118) (3) Jeff Gordon  (Chevrolet, Hendrick Motorsports) 5948 (−150)
V8 Supercars:
V8 Supercar Challenge in Surfers Paradise, Queensland:
Race 20: (1) Mark Winterbottom  (Ford Falcon) (2) Garth Tander  (Holden Commodore) (3) James Courtney  (Ford Falcon)
Drivers' standings (after 20 of 26 races): (1) Jamie Whincup  (Ford Falcon) 2604 points (2) Will Davison  (Holden Commodore) 2572 (3) Tander 2315
World Rally Championship:
Rally of Great Britain: (1) Sébastien Loeb  (Citroën C4 WRC) 3:16:25.4 (2) Mikko Hirvonen  (Ford Focus RS WRC 09) +1:06.1 (3) Dani Sordo  (Citroën C4 WRC) +1:07.1
Final drivers' standings: (1) Loeb 93 points (2) Hirvonen 92 (3) Sordo 64
Loeb wins his sixth straight championship title.
Final manufacturers' standings: (1) Citroën Total 167 (2) BP Ford 140 (3) Stobart M-Sport 80

Badminton
BWF Super Series:
Denmark Super Series in Odense:
Women's Doubles: Pan Pan/Zhang Yawen  [6] def. Kamilla Rytter Juhl/Lena Frier Kristiansen  [2] 22–20 18–21 21–12
Women's Singles: Tine Rasmussen  [2] def. Wang Yihan  [1] 21–18 19–21 21–14
Mixed Doubles: Joachim Fischer Nielsen/Christinna Pedersen  [2] def. Anthony Clark/Donna Kellogg  [7] 21–16 25–27 21–17
Men's Doubles: Koo Kien Keat/Tan Boon Heong  [2] def. Mathias Boe/Carsten Mogensen  [3] 20–22 21–14 21–17
Men's Singles: Simon Santoso  [5] def. Marc Zwiebler  21–14 21–6

Baseball
Major League Baseball postseason:
ALCS:
Game 6: New York Yankees 5, Los Angeles Angels of Anaheim 2. Yankees win best-of-7 series 4–2.

Cricket
Australia in India:
1st ODI in Vadodara:
 292/8 (50 ov);  288/8 (50.0 ov). Australia win by 4 runs, lead the 7-match series 1–0

Football (soccer)
U-17 World Cup in Nigeria:
Group C:
 2–0 
 2–1 
Group D:
 1–0 
 1–1 
2011 FIFA Women's World Cup qualification (UEFA):
Group 2:  1–6 
Standings: Slovakia, Belarus, Norway 3 points (1 match).
Group 4:  7–0 
Standings: Hungary 6 points (2 matches), Poland 6 (3), Ukraine, Romania 3 (2).
Group 5:  8–0 
Standings: Spain 6 points (2 matches), England 3 (1).
Group 6:  3–0 
Standings: Russia 6 points (2 matches), Switzerland 3 (2), Israel 3 (1), Ireland 3 (3).
Group 8:  2–1 
Standings: Sweden 6 points (2 matches), Belgium 3 (2), Wales 3 (3), Czech Republic 3 (2).

Golf
PGA Tour:
Fall Series:
Frys.com Open in Scottsdale, Arizona:
Winner: Troy Matteson  262 (−18) PO
Matteson beats fellow Americans Rickie Fowler and Jamie Lovemark on the second playoff hole to win his second PGA Tour title, after the 2006 Frys.com Open, an event now known as the Justin Timberlake Shriners Hospitals for Children Open. Earlier in the tournament he sets a 36-hole PGA Tour record of 122 with consecutive rounds of 61.
European Tour:
Castelló Masters Costa Azahar in Castellón, Spain:
Winner: Michael Jonzon  264 (−20)
Jonzon collects his second European Tour win, and first since 1997.

Motorcycle racing
Moto GP:
Malaysian Grand Prix in Sepang: (1) Casey Stoner  (Ducati) 47:24.834 (2) Dani Pedrosa  (Honda) +14.666 (3) Valentino Rossi  (Yamaha) +19.385
Riders' standings (after 16 of 17 races): (1) Rossi 286 points (2) Jorge Lorenzo  (Yamaha) 245 (3) Stoner 220
Rossi secures his ninth championship title.
Manufacturers' standings: (1) Yamaha 366 (2) Honda 272 (3) Ducati 261
Superbike:
Portimão Superbike World Championship round in Portimão, Portugal:
Race 1: (1) Ben Spies  (Yamaha YZF-R1) 38:15.390 (2) Jonathan Rea  (Honda CBR1000RR) +1.697 (3) Max Biaggi  (Aprilia RSV 4) +2.113
Race 2: (1) Michel Fabrizio  (Ducati 1198) 38'19.654 (2) Noriyuki Haga  (Ducati 1198) 38'20.849 (3) Rea 38'21.148
Final riders' standings: (1) Spies 462 points (2) Haga 456 (3) Fabrizio 382
Final manufacturers' standings: (1) Ducati 572 (2) Yamaha 505 (3) Honda 431

Rugby league
European Cup:
Group 2:
 8–88 
Standings: Ireland, Wales 2 points (1 match), Serbia 0 (2).
Pacific Cup:
Round Robin Match in Port Moresby:
 44–14

Tennis
ATP World Tour:
If Stockholm Open in Stockholm, Sweden:
Final: Marcos Baghdatis  def. Olivier Rochus  6–1, 7–5
Baghdatis wins his first title of the year and third of his career.
Kremlin Cup in Moscow, Russia:
Final: Mikhail Youzhny  (3) def. Janko Tipsarević  (6) 6–7(5), 6–0, 6–4
Youzhny wins his first title of the year, and the fifth of his career.
WTA Tour:
Kremlin Cup in Moscow, Russia:
Final: Francesca Schiavone  (8) def. Olga Govortsova  6–3, 6–0
Schiavone wins her first title of the year, and the second of her career.
BGL Luxembourg Open in Luxembourg City, Luxembourg:
Final: Timea Bacsinszky  def. Sabine Lisicki  (6) 6–2, 7–5
Bacsinszky wins the first title of her career.

October 24, 2009 (Saturday)

American football
NCAA:
BCS Top 10 (unbeaten teams in bold):
(1) Florida 29, Mississippi State 19
"Third Saturday in October": (2) Alabama 12, Tennessee 10
Terrence Kody blocks Daniel Lincoln's 44-yard field-goal attempt as time expires to maintain the Crimson Tide's unbeaten record.
(3) Texas 41, Missouri 7
(4) Boise State 54, Hawaii 9
The Keg of Nails: (5) Cincinnati 41, Louisville 10
(6) Iowa 15, Michigan State 13
 Ricky Stanzi connects with Marvin McNutt on a 7-yard touchdown pass on the game's final play to keep the Hawkeyes unbeaten.
(7) USC 42, Oregon State 36
(8) TCU 38, (16) Brigham Young 7
(9) LSU 31, Auburn 10
Clemson 40, (10) Miami 37 (OT)
 Other games:
 Oklahoma 35, (25) Kansas 13

Alpine skiing
World Cup:
Women's GS in Sölden, Austria:  Tanja Poutiainen  2:24.96  Kathrin Zettel  2:24.97  Denise Karbon  2:25.28

Auto racing
Nationwide Series:
Kroger On Track for the Cure 250 in Millington, Tennessee:
(1) Brad Keselowski  (Chevrolet, JR Motorsports) (2) Kyle Busch  (Toyota, Joe Gibbs Racing) (3) Jason Leffler  (Toyota, Braun Racing)
Standings (with 3 races remaining): (1) Busch 5004 points (2) Carl Edwards  (Ford, Roush Fenway Racing) 4809 (3) Keselowski 4732
V8 Supercars:
V8 Supercar Challenge in Surfers Paradise, Queensland:
Race 19: (1) Garth Tander  (Holden Commodore) (2) Mark Winterbottom  (Ford Falcon) (3) Will Davison  (Holden Commodore)
Drivers' standings (after 19 of 26 races): (1) Jamie Whincup  (Ford Falcon) 2553 points (2) Davison 2512 (3) Tander 2181

Baseball
Major League Baseball postseason:
ALCS:
Game 6, Los Angeles Angels of Anaheim at New York Yankees, postponed (rain). Yankees lead best-of-7 series 3–2.
Nippon Professional Baseball postseason:
Pacific League Climax Series, second stage:
Game 4, Hokkaido Nippon-Ham Fighters 9, Tohoku Rakuten Golden Eagles 4. Fighters win best-of-7 series 4–1.
Central League Climax Series, second stage:
Game 4, Yomiuri Giants 8, Chunichi Dragons 2. Giants win best-of-7 series 4–1.

Basketball
Philippine NCAA in Quezon City:
Seniors' Finals: San Sebastian Stags 76, San Beda Red Lions 61, San Sebastian win best-of-3 series 2–0
San Sebastian clinch their twelfth NCAA championship, ending San Beda's 3-year championship run.

Figure skating
ISU Grand Prix:
Rostelecom Cup in Moscow, Russia:
Men:  Evgeni Plushenko  240.65  Takahiko Kozuka  215.13  Artem Borodulin  201.55
Plushenko wins his first competition since he won the gold medal at the 2006 Olympics.
Pairs:  Pang Qing/Tong Jian  191.33  Yuko Kavaguti/Alexander Smirnov  180.14  Keauna McLaughlin/Rockne Brubaker  160.55
Ice dance:  Meryl Davis/Charlie White  201.10  Anna Cappelini/Luca Lanotte  168.57  Ekaterina Rubleva/Ivan Shefer  163.32
Ladies:  Miki Ando  171.93  Ashley Wagner  163.97  Alena Leonova  160.06

Football (soccer)
U-17 World Cup in Nigeria:
Group A:
 3–3 
 0–1 
Group B:
 3–2 
 0–2 
2011 FIFA Women's World Cup qualification (UEFA):
Group 1:
 0–1 
 2–0 
Standings: France 6 points (2 matches), Iceland 6 (3), Northern Ireland 3 (1).
Group 2:  3–0 
Group 3:
 15–0 
 0–1 
Standings: Denmark 6 points (2 matches), Scotland 3 (1), Greece 3 (3).
Group 4:  2–0 
Group 5:  2–0 
Group 6:  1–0 
Group 7:
 0–8 
 0–3 
Standings: Italy 9 points (3 matches), Finland 6 (2).
Group 8:  0–3

Rugby league
European Cup:
Group 1:
 86–0 
Standings: Scotland, Lebanon 2 points (1 match), Italy 0 (2).
Four Nations:
Round 1:
 20–20 
Pacific Cup:
Round Robin Match in Port Moresby:
 22–24

October 23, 2009 (Friday)

Baseball
Nippon Professional Baseball postseason:
Pacific League Climax Series, second stage:
Game 3, Tohoku Rakuten Golden Eagles 3, Hokkaido Nippon-Ham Fighters 2. Fighters lead best-of-7 series 3–1.
Central League Climax Series, second stage:
Game 3, Yomiuri Giants 5, Chunichi Dragons 4. Giants lead best-of-7 series 3–1.

Basketball
 The NBA's officials approve a new collective bargaining agreement with the league, ending a month-long lockout days before the start of the regular season on Tuesday. (AP via ESPN)

Figure skating
ISU Grand Prix:
Rostelecom Cup in Moscow, Russia:
Men's short program: (1) Evgeni Plushenko  82.25 (2) Takahiko Kozuka  75.50 (3) Johnny Weir  72.57
This is Plushenko's first ISU competition since he won the gold medal at the 2006 Olympics.
Pairs' short program: (1) Pang Qing/Tong Jian  65.40 (2) Yuko Kavaguti/Alexander Smirnov  61.62 (3) Keauna McLaughlin/Rockne Brubaker  61.34
Ladies' short program: (1) Júlia Sebestyén  57.94 (2) Alissa Czisny  57.64 (3) Miki Ando  57.18
Ice dance (after original dance): (1) Meryl Davis/Charlie White  100.08 (2) Anna Cappelini/Luca Lanotte  85.31 (3) Ekaterina Rubleva/Ivan Shefer  81.25

Rugby league
Four Nations:
Round 1:
 34–12

October 22, 2009 (Thursday)

Baseball
Major League Baseball postseason:
ALCS:
Game 5: Los Angeles Angels of Anaheim 7, New York Yankees 6. Yankees lead best-of-7 series 3–2.
 The Angels blow a 4–0 lead in the top of the seventh inning, giving up 6 runs, but come back with 3 in the bottom of the inning and stay alive in the series.
Nippon Professional Baseball postseason:
Pacific League Climax Series, second stage:
Game 2: Hokkaido Nippon-Ham Fighters 3, Tohoku Rakuten Golden Eagles 1. Fighters lead best-of-7 series 3–0.
Central League Climax Series, second stage:
Game 2: Yomiuri Giants 6, Chunichi Dragons 4. Giants lead best-of-7 series 2–1.

Basketball
Euroleague:
Regular Season Game 1:
Group B:
Lietuvos Rytas  77–70  Efes Pilsen
Partizan  64–72  Unicaja Málaga
Group C:
Lottomatica Roma  77–65  Caja Laboral Baskonia
Group D:
Khimki  84–81  Real Madrid (OT)
Armani Jeans Milano  67–75  Panathinaikos

Football (soccer)
UEFA Europa League group stage, Matchday 3:
Group A:
Timişoara  0–0  Anderlecht
Ajax  2–1  Dinamo Zagreb
Group B:
Valencia  1–1  Slavia Prague
Lille  3–0  Genoa
Group C:
Celtic   0–1  Hamburg
Hapoel Tel Aviv  5–1  Rapid Wien
Group D:
Ventspils  1–2  Sporting CP
Hertha BSC  0–1  Heerenveen
Group E:
Fulham  1–1  Roma
CSKA Sofia  0–2  Basel
Group F:
Galatasaray  4–1  Dinamo București
Panathinaikos  1–0  Sturm Graz
Group G:
Red Bull Salzburg  1–0  Levski Sofia
Lazio  2–1  Villarreal
Group H:
Sheriff Tiraspol  2–0  Twente
Steaua București  0–1  Fenerbahçe
Group I:
BATE Borisov  2–1  AEK Athens
Benfica  5–0  Everton
Group J:
Shakhtar Donetsk  4–0  Toulouse
Club Brugge  2–0  Partizan
Group K:
PSV Eindhoven  1–0  Copenhagen
Sparta Prague  2–0  CFR Cluj
Group L:
Austria Wien  2–2  Werder Bremen
Athletic Bilbao  2–1  Nacional
Copa Sudamericana Quarterfinals, first leg:
Fluminense  2–2  Universidad de Chile
CONCACAF Champions League Group Stage, round 6: (teams in bold advance to the quarterfinals)
Group B:
San Juan Jabloteh  2–4  Marathón
Final standings: Toluca 13 points, Marathón 12, D.C. United 10, San Juan Jabloteh 0.
Group D:
Comunicaciones  2–1  UNAM
Final standings: UNAM 13 points, Comunicaciones 9, W Connection 7, Real España 6.

Snooker
Premier League Snooker – League phase in Grimsby, Lincolnshire:
Ronnie O'Sullivan  3–3 Stephen Hendry 
Shaun Murphy  5–1 Marco Fu 
Standings: Ronnie O'Sullivan 6 points; John Higgins, Stephen Hendry, Judd Trump 4; Neil Robertson 3; Shaun Murphy 2; Marco Fu 1.

October 21, 2009 (Wednesday)

Baseball
Major League Baseball postseason:
NLCS:
Game 5: Philadelphia Phillies 10, Los Angeles Dodgers 4. Phillies win best-of-7 series 4–1.
Jayson Werth's 3-run homer in the 1st inning sets the Phillies on their way to claim the National League title for the second straight year.
Nippon Professional Baseball postseason:
Pacific League Climax Series, second stage:
Game 1, Hokkaido Nippon-Ham Fighters 9, Tohoku Rakuten Golden Eagles 8. Fighters lead best-of-7 series 2–0.
The Fighters rally from 8–4 down in the bottom of the 9th inning.
Central League Climax Series, second stage:
Game 1, Chunichi Dragons 7, Yomiuri Giants 2. Best-of-7 series tied 1–1.

Basketball
Euroleague:
Regular Season Game 1:
Group A:
Cibona  40–85  Montepaschi Siena
Cibona set a record for fewest points by a home team in the Euroleague.
Žalgiris  71–52  ASVEL Villeurbanne
Fenerbahçe Ülker  59–82  Regal FC Barcelona
Group B:
Olympiacos  94–72  Orléans
Group C:
Maroussi  65–66  CSKA Moscow
Group D:
Asseco Prokom Gdynia  81–87  EWE Baskets Oldenburg

Football (soccer)
UEFA Champions League group stage, Matchday 3:
Group A:
Bordeaux  2–1  Bayern Munich
Juventus  1–0  Maccabi Haifa
Standings: Bordeaux 7 points, Juventus 5, Bayern Munich 4, Maccabi Haifa 0.
Group B:
CSKA Moscow  0–1  Manchester United
Wolfsburg  0–0  Beşiktaş
Standings: Manchester United 9 points, Wolfsburg 4, CSKA Moscow 3, Beşiktaş 1.
Group C:
Real Madrid  2–3  Milan
Zürich  0–1  Marseille
Standings: Milan, Real Madrid 6 points, Marseille, Zürich 3.
Group D:
Porto  2–1  APOEL
Chelsea  4–0  Atlético Madrid
Standings: Chelsea 9 points, Porto 6, APOEL, Atlético Madrid 1.
Copa Sudamericana Quarterfinals, first leg:
Cerro Porteño  2–1  Botafogo
River Plate  0–1  San Lorenzo
AFC Champions League Semi-finals, first leg:
Al-Ittihad  6–2  Nagoya Grampus
Pohang Steelers  2–0  Umm-Salal
AFC Cup Semi-finals, second leg: (first leg score in parentheses)
South China  0–1 (1–2)  Al-Kuwait. Al-Kuwait win 3–1 on aggregate.
Al-Karamah  3–0 (1–2)  Bình Dương. Al-Karamah win 4–2 on aggregate.
CONCACAF Champions League Group Stage, round 6: (teams in bold advance to the quarterfinals)
Group A:
Pachuca  2–0  Árabe Unido
Isidro Metapán  3–2  Houston Dynamo
Final standings: Pachuca 15 points, Árabe Unido 10, Houston Dynamo 7, Isidro Metapán 3.
Group D:
W Connection  3–2  Real España
Standings: UNAM 13 points (5 matches),  W Connection 7 (6), Communicaciones 6 (5), Real España 6 (6).
2011 FIFA Women's World Cup qualification (UEFA):
Group 3:  0–1

October 20, 2009 (Tuesday)

Baseball
Major League Baseball postseason:
ALCS:
Game 4: New York Yankees 10, Los Angeles Angels of Anaheim 1. Yankees lead best-of-7 series 3–1.

Basketball
 The WNBA announces that the Detroit Shock, which won three WNBA titles, most recently in 2008, has been purchased by a group of investors in Tulsa, Oklahoma, and will be moved to that city for the 2010 season. The new team name has not yet been announced, but former University of Tulsa and Arkansas head coach Nolan Richardson has been named head coach and general manager. (AP via ESPN)

Football (soccer)
UEFA Champions League group stage, Matchday 3:
Group E:
Debrecen  3–4  Fiorentina
Liverpool  1–2  Lyon
Standings: Lyon 9 points, Fiorentina 6, Liverpool 3, Debrecen 0.
Group F:
Barcelona  1–2  Rubin Kazan
Internazionale  2–2  Dynamo Kyiv
Standings: Barcelona, Dynamo Kyiv, Rubin Kazan 4 points, Inter 3.
Group G:
Rangers  1–4  Unirea Urziceni
Stuttgart  1–3  Sevilla
Standings: Sevilla 9 points, Unirea Urziceni 4, Stuttgart 2, Rangers 1.
Group H:
AZ  1–1  Arsenal
Olympiacos  2–1  Standard Liège
Standings: Arsenal 7 points, Olympiacos 6, AZ 2, Standard Liège 1.
Copa Sudamericana Quarterfinals, first leg:
Vélez Sarsfield  1–1  LDU Quito
CONCACAF Champions League Group Stage, round 6: (teams in bold advance to the quarterfinals)
Group B:
Toluca  1–1  D.C. United
Standings: Toluca 13 points (6 matches), D.C. United 10 (6), Marathón 9 (5), San Juan Jabloteh 0 (5).
Group C:
Puerto Rico Islanders  1–1  Columbus Crew
Saprissa  1–2  Cruz Azul
Final standings: Cruz Azul 16 points, Columbus Crew 8, Saprissa 5, Puerto Rico Islanders 3.

October 19, 2009 (Monday)

American football
NFL Monday Night Football Week 6 (unbeaten team in bold):
Denver Broncos 34, San Diego Chargers 23
 Eddie Royal becomes the first Bronco and 11th NFL player overall to return a kickoff and a punt for touchdowns in the same game.

Baseball
Major League Baseball postseason:
ALCS:
Game 3, Los Angeles Angels of Anaheim 5, New York Yankees 4, 11 innings. Yankees lead best-of-7 series 2–1.
NLCS:
Game 4: Philadelphia Phillies 5, Los Angeles Dodgers 4. Phillies lead best-of-7 series 3–1.
 Jimmy Rollins' walk-off two-run double puts the Phils one win away from the World Series.
Nippon Professional Baseball postseason:
Central League Climax Series, first stage:
Game 3, Chunichi Dragons 7, Tokyo Yakult Swallows 4. Dragons win best-of-3 series 2–1.

October 18, 2009 (Sunday)

American football
NFL Week 6 (unbeaten teams in bold):
Carolina Panthers 28, Tampa Bay Buccaneers 21
The Bucs remain winless on the season.
Houston Texans 28, Cincinnati Bengals 17
Green Bay Packers 26, Detroit Lions 0
Kansas City Chiefs 14, Washington Redskins 6
The Chiefs pick up their first win of the season.
Pittsburgh Steelers 27, Cleveland Browns 14
Ben Roethlisberger becomes the second quarterback this season to throw for 400 yards.
Jacksonville Jaguars 23, St. Louis Rams 20 (OT)
Josh Scobee's field goal keeps the Rams winless.
Minnesota Vikings 33, Baltimore Ravens 31
New Orleans Saints 48, New York Giants 27
The Saints win the battle of unbeatens, with Drew Brees throwing for four touchdowns.
Arizona Cardinals 27, Seattle Seahawks 3
Cardinals QB Kurt Warner ties Dan Marino's record as the fastest to 30,000 career passing yards, reaching the milestone in his 114th NFL game.
Oakland Raiders 13, Philadelphia Eagles 9
New England Patriots 59, Tennessee Titans 0
 The Patriots tie for the largest margin of victory in any game since the AFL–NFL merger in 1970, and set franchise records for points and total yards (619). Quarterback Tom Brady throws six TD passes, five of them in the second quarter to set a new NFL record for TD passes in a quarter. The winless Titans suffer their largest defeat in franchise history.
Buffalo Bills 16, New York Jets 13 (OT)
Sunday Night Football Atlanta Falcons 21, Chicago Bears 14
Bye week: Dallas Cowboys, Indianapolis Colts, Miami Dolphins, San Francisco 49ers
NCAA College Football:
UConn cornerback Jasper Howard is murdered, age 20, in a stabbing at the University of Connecticut Student Union, just hours after UConn's game against Louisville.

Auto racing
Formula One:
Brazilian Grand Prix in São Paulo:
(1) Mark Webber  (Red Bull–Renault) 1:32:23.081 (2) Robert Kubica  (BMW Sauber) +7.626 (3) Lewis Hamilton  (McLaren–Mercedes) +18.944
Drivers' Championship standings (after 16 of 17 races): (1) Jenson Button  (Brawn–Mercedes) 89 points (2) Sebastian Vettel  (Red Bull-Renault) 74 (3) Rubens Barrichello  (Brawn-Mercedes) 72
Button secures the title with one race remaining.
Constructors' Championship standings: (1) Brawn-Mercedes 161 points (2) Red Bull-Renault 135.5 (3) McLaren-Mercedes 71

Baseball
Major League Baseball postseason:
NLCS:
Game 3, Philadelphia Phillies 11, Los Angeles Dodgers 0. Phillies lead best-of-7 series 2–1.
Nippon Professional Baseball postseason:
Central League Climax Series, first stage:
Game 2, Chunichi Dragons 3, Tokyo Yakult Swallows 2. Best-of-3 series tied 1–1.

Basketball
Africa Championship for Women in Antananarivo, Madagascar:
Seventh place match:  66–61 
Fifth place match:  67–57 
Bronze medal match:  57–76  
Final:   72–57  
Senegal win the title for the tenth time.

Cricket
Kenya in Zimbabwe:
5th ODI in Harare:
 329/3 (50 ov, Hamilton Masakadza 178*);  187 (39.3 ov). Zimbabwe win by 142 runs and win the 5-match series 4–1.

Football (soccer)
CAF Champions League semifinals, second leg: (first leg score in parentheses)
TP Mazembe  0–2 (5–2)  Al-Hilal. TP Mazembe win 5–4 on aggregate.
CAF Confederation Cup Semifinals, second leg: (first leg score in parentheses)
Stade Malien  4–2 (2–2)  ENPPI. Stade Malien win 6–4 on aggregate.
Women's Copa Libertadores in Santos and Guarujá, Brazil:
Bronze medal match:  Formas Íntimas  2–0  Everton
Final:  Santos  9–0   Universidad Autónoma

Golf
PGA Tour:
Fall Series:
Justin Timberlake Shriners Hospitals for Children Open in Las Vegas:
Winner: Martin Laird  265 (−19) PO
Laird wins his first PGA Tour title in a three-way playoff, eliminating Chad Campbell  on the second playoff hole and George McNeill  on the third.
European Tour:
Portugal Masters in Vilamoura, Portugal:
Winner: Lee Westwood  265 (−23)
Westwood collects his first professional win in over two years, a period in which he had 26 top-10 finishes. He also takes the lead in the Race to Dubai and will rise to the top 5 in the Official World Golf Rankings.

Gymnastics
World Artistic Gymnastics Championships in London, Great Britain:
Men's Vault:  Marian Drăgulescu  16.575  Flavius Koczi  16.337  Anton Golotsutskov  16.287
Women's Balance Beam:  Deng Linlin  15.000  Lauren Mitchell  14.875  Ivana Hong  14.550
Men's Parallel Bars:  Wang Guanyin  15.950  Feng Zhe  15.775  Kazuhito Tanaka  15.500
Women's Floor Exercise:  Elizabeth Tweddle  14.650  Lauren Mitchell  14.550  Sui Lu  14.300
Men's Horizontal Bar:  Zou Kai  16.150  Epke Zonderland  15.825  Igor Cassina  15.625

Motorcycle racing
Moto GP:
Australian Grand Prix in Phillip Island: (1) Casey Stoner  (Ducati) 40:56.651 (2) Valentino Rossi  (Yamaha) +1.935 (3) Dani Pedrosa  (Honda) +22.618
Riders' standings (after 15 of 17 races): (1) Rossi 270 points (2) Jorge Lorenzo  (Yamaha) 232 (3) Stoner 195
Manufacturers' standings: (1) Yamaha 350 (2) Honda 252 (3) Ducati 236

Rugby league
European Cup:
Group 2:
 82–0

Rugby union
Heineken Cup pool stage, matchday 2:
Pool 3: Ospreys  25–24  Clermont Auvergne
Standings: Leicester Tigers 8 points, Clermont, Ospreys 6, Viadana 0.
Pool 4: Bath  27–29  Stade Français
Standings: Stade Français 9 points, Ulster 5, Edinburgh 4, Bath 1.
Amlin Challenge Cup pool stage, matchday 2:
Pool 1: Leeds  37–13  Overmach Parma
Standings: Bourgoin 8 points, Leeds, București Oaks 5, Parma 0.
Pool 5: Falcons  45–3  Albi
Standings: Falcons 10 points, Montauban 8, Padova 1, Albi 0.

Snooker
World Series of Snooker, Tournament in Prague, Czech Republic
Semi-finals:
Graeme Dott  def. Stephen Maguire  5–1
Jimmy White  def. John Higgins  5–1
Final
Jimmy White  def. Graeme Dott  5–3

Taekwondo
World Championships in Copenhagen, Denmark:
Men's 74 kg:  Kim Joon-Tae   Maxime Potvin   Mark López  & Mokdad Ounis 
Women's 62 kg:  Lim Su-Jeong   Zhang Hua   Estefanía Hernández  & Chonnapas Premwaew 
Women's +73 kg:  Rosana Simón   Liu Rui   Jo Seol  & Natália Falavigna

Tennis
ATP World Tour:
Shanghai Masters in Shanghai, China:
Final: (6) Nikolay Davydenko  def. (1) Rafael Nadal  7–6 (3), 6–3
Davydenko wins his fourth title of the year and the 18th of his career. He also wins his third Masters title and improves his perfect record in Masters finals to 3–0.
WTA Tour:
Generali Ladies Linz in Linz, Austria:
Final: (3) Yanina Wickmayer  def. Petra Kvitová  6–3, 6–4
Wickmayer wins her second title of the year and career.
HP Open in Osaka, Japan:
Final: (3) Samantha Stosur  def. (4) Francesca Schiavone  7–5, 6–1
Stosur wins her first WTA Tour title after losing five previous finals.

October 17, 2009 (Saturday)

Auto racing
Chase for the Sprint Cup:
NASCAR Banking 500 Only from Bank of America in Concord, North Carolina
(1) Jimmie Johnson  (Chevrolet, Hendrick Motorsports) (2) Matt Kenseth  (Ford, Roush Fenway Racing) (3) Kasey Kahne  (Dodge, Richard Petty Motorsports)
Drivers' standings (with 5 races remaining): (1) Johnson 5923 points (2) Mark Martin  (Chevrolet, Hendrick Motorsports) 5833 (3) Jeff Gordon  (Chevrolet, Hendrick Motorsports) 5788

American football
NCAA:
AP Top 10 (unbeaten teams in bold):
(1) Florida 23, Arkansas 20
(2) Alabama 20, (22) South Carolina 6
Red River Rivalry in Dallas: (3) Texas 16, (20) Oklahoma 13
 For the second time this season, Sooners quarterback Sam Bradford suffers an injury to his right (throwing) shoulder.
(19) Georgia Tech 28, (4) Virginia Tech 23
Jeweled Shillelagh: (6) USC 34, (25) Notre Dame 27
 The Trojans win the game for the eighth straight time.
Purdue 26, (7) Ohio State 18
(9) Miami 27, UCF 7
Played earlier this week: (5) Boise State, (8) Cincinnati
Idle this week: (10) LSU
 Other games:
 Texas Tech 31, (15) Nebraska 10
 Colorado 34, (17) Kansas 30
Other remaining unbeaten teams (rankings in parentheses):
(11) Iowa, (12) TCU

Baseball
Major League Baseball postseason:
ALCS:
Game 2: New York Yankees 4, Los Angeles Angels of Anaheim 3 (13 innings). Yankees lead best-of-7 series 2–0.
Nippon Professional Baseball postseason:
Pacific League Climax Series, first stage:
Game 2: Tohoku Rakuten Golden Eagles 4, Fukuoka SoftBank Hawks 1. Golden Eagles win best-of-3 series 2–0.
Central League Climax Series, first stage:
Game 1: Tokyo Yakult Swallows 3, Chunichi Dragons 2. Swallows lead best-of-3 series 1–0.

Basketball
Africa Championship for Women in Antananarivo, Madagascar:
Classification 5–8:
 62–51 
 66–73 
Semifinals: (winners qualify for 2010 World Championship)
 75–54 
 70–60 (OT)

Cricket
Kenya in Zimbabwe:
4th ODI in Harare:
 270/8 (50 ov);  271/4 (48.0 ov). Zimbabwe win by 6 wickets, and lead the 5-match series 3–1.

Figure skating
ISU Grand Prix:
Trophée Eric Bompard in Paris, France:
Men:  Nobunari Oda  242.53  Tomáš Verner  229.96  Adam Rippon  219.96
Pairs:  Maria Mukhortova/Maxim Trankov  192.93  Jessica Dubé/Bryce Davison  180.97  Aliona Savchenko/Robin Szolkowy  174.42
Ladies:  Kim Yuna  210.03  Mao Asada  173.99  Yukari Nakano  165.70
Ice dance:  Tessa Virtue/Scott Moir  197.71  Nathalie Péchalat/Fabian Bourzat  181.64  Sinead Kerr/John Kerr  177.11

Gymnastics
World Artistic Gymnastics Championships in London, Great Britain:
Men's Floor Exercise:  Marian Drăgulescu  15.700  Zou Kai  15.675  Alexander Shatilov  15.575
Women's Vault:  Kayla Williams  15.087  Ariella Kaeslin  14.525  Youna Dufournet  14.450
Men's Pommel Horse:  Zhang Hongtao  16.200  Krisztián Berki  16.075  Prashanth Sellathurai  15.400
Women's Uneven Bars:  He Kexin  16.000  Koko Tsurumi  14.875  Ana Porgras  & Rebecca Bross  14.675
Men's Rings:  Yang Mingyong  15.675  Yordan Yovchev  15.575  Oleksandr Vorobiov  15.550

Rugby league
European Cup:
Group 1:
 0–104 
Pacific Cup:
Qualifying in Cairns:
 20–22

Rugby union
Heineken Cup pool stage, matchday 2:
Pool 1: Munster (Ireland) 41–10  Benetton Treviso
Standings: Munster 6 points, Perpignan 5, Northampton, Treviso 4.
Pool 2: Biarritz  42–15  Gloucester
Standings: Biarritz 9 points, Dragons 5, Gloucester 4, Glasgow Warriors 1.
Pool 3: Viadana  11–46  Leicester Tigers
Pool 4: Edinburgh  17–13 (Ireland) Ulster
Pool 5: Harlequins  19–23  Toulouse
Standings: Toulouse 9 points, Cardiff Blues 5, Sale 4, Harlequins 1.
Pool 6:
London Irish  25–27  Scarlets
Brive  13–36 (Ireland) Leinster
Standings: Scarlets 8 points, Leinster, London Irish 5, Brive 0.
Amlin Challenge Cup pool stage, matchday 2:
Pool 1: București Oaks  19–21  Bourgoin
Pool 2: Olympus Madrid  5–38  Worcester
Standings: Connacht 9 points, Worcester 6, Montpellier 5, Olympus Madrid 0.
Pool 3: Rovigo  11–76  Castres
Standings: Toulon 8 points, Castres, Saracens 5, Rovigo 0.
Pool 4:
Rugby Roma  0–57  Wasps
Racing Métro  16–20  Bayonne
Standings: Bayonne, Wasps 9 points, Racing Métro 2, Roma 0.
Currie Cup semifinals:
 21–23 Free State Cheetahs
Western Province 19–21 Blue Bulls

Snooker
World Series of Snooker, Tournament in Prague, Czech Republic
Quarter-finals:
Stephen Maguire  def. Kryštof Michal  5–0
Graeme Dott  def. Osip Zusmanovic  5–0
John Higgins  def. Lukáš Křenek  5–1
Jimmy White  def. Sishuo Wang  5–0

Taekwondo
World Championships in Copenhagen, Denmark:
Men's 54 kg:  Choi Yeon-Ho   Mahmood Haidari   Chutchawal Khawlaor  & Meisam Bagheri 
Men's 87 kg:  Bahri Tanrıkulu   Carlo Molfetta   Vanja Babić  & Yousef Karami 
Women's 46 kg:  Park Hyo-Ji   Zoraida Santiago   Buttree Puedpong  & Yvette Yong 
Women's 73 kg:  Hang Yingying   Lee In-Jong   Furkan Asena Aydın  & Anastasia Baryshnikova

Volleyball
NORCECA Men's Championship in Bayamón, Puerto Rico:
Seventh place match:  3–1 
Fifth place match:  3–2 
Bronze medal match:  2–3  
Final:   3–1  
Cuba win the title for the 14th time, and qualify for the World Grand Champions Cup.

October 16, 2009 (Friday)

Auto racing
Nationwide Series:
Dollar General 300 in Concord, North Carolina
(1) Kyle Busch  (Toyota, Joe Gibbs Racing) (2) Mike Bliss  (Toyota, CJM Racing) (3) Dave Blaney  (Toyota, NEMCO Motorsports)

Baseball
Major League Baseball postseason:
ALCS:
Game 1, New York Yankees 4, Los Angeles Angels of Anaheim 1. Yankees lead best-of-7 series 1–0.
NLCS:
Game 2, Los Angeles Dodgers 2, Philadelphia Phillies 1. Best-of-7 series tied 1–1.
Nippon Professional Baseball postseason:
Pacific League Climax Series, first stage:
Game 1, Tohoku Rakuten Golden Eagles 11, Fukuoka SoftBank Hawks 4. Golden Eagles lead best-of-3 series 1–0.

Basketball
Africa Championship for Women in Antananarivo, Madagascar:
Quarterfinals:
 89–45 
 55–44 
 80–46 
 36–68

Figure skating
ISU Grand Prix:
Trophée Eric Bompard in Paris, France:
Men's short program: (1) Tomáš Verner  81.00 (2) Nobunari Oda  79.20 (3) Adam Rippon  75.82
Pairs' short program: (1) Aliona Savchenko/Robin Szolkowy  72.98 (2) Maria Mukhortova/Maxim Trankov  66.88 (3) Jessica Dubé/Bryce Davison  64.54
Ladies' short program: (1) Kim Yuna  76.08 (2) Yukari Nakano  59.64 (3) Mao Asada  58.96
Ice dance after original dance: (1) Tessa Virtue/Scott Moir  100.32  (2) Nathalie Péchalat/Fabian Bourzat  91.87 (3) Sinead Kerr/John Kerr  90.86

Football (soccer)
U-20 World Cup in Egypt:
Bronze medal match:   1–1 (2–0 pen.) 
Final:   0–0 (3–4 pen.)  
Ghana win the title for the first time.
CAF Confederation Cup Semifinals, second leg: (first leg score in parentheses)
ES Sétif  1–0 (1–1)  Bayelsa United. ES Sétif win 2–1 on aggregate.
Women's Copa Libertadores in São Paulo, Brazil:
Semifinals:
Santos  5–0  Formas Íntimas
Universidad Autónoma  1–0  Everton

Gymnastics
World Artistic Gymnastics Championships in London, Great Britain:
Women's All-around Final:  Bridget Sloan  57.825 points  Rebecca Bross  57.775  Koko Tsurumi  57.175

Rugby union
Heineken Cup pool stage, matchday 2:
Pool 1: Perpignan  29–13  Northampton Saints
Pool 2: Newport Gwent Dragons  22–14  Glasgow Warriors
Pool 5: Sale Sharks  27–26  Cardiff Blues
Amlin Challenge Cup pool stage, matchday 2:
Pool 2: Montpellier  19–22 (Ireland) Connacht
Pool 5: Montauban  27–10  Petrarca Padova

Taekwondo
World Championships in Copenhagen, Denmark:
Men's 63 kg:  Yeom Hyo-Seob   Reza Naderian   Javier Marrón  & Cem Uluğnuyan 
Men's 68 kg:  Mohammad Bagheri   Idulio Islas   Servet Tazegül  & Balla Dièye 
Women's 53 kg:  Danielle Pelham   Sarita Phongsri   Kwon Eun-Kyung  & Euda Carías

Volleyball
NORCECA Men's Championship in Bayamón, Puerto Rico:
Classification 5–8:
 1–3 
 0–3 
Semifinals:
 3–0 
 3–0

October 15, 2009 (Thursday)

American football
NCAA:
AP Top 10 (unbeaten team in bold):
(8) Cincinnati 34, (21) South Florida 17

Baseball
Major League Baseball postseason:
NLCS:
 Game 1: Philadelphia Phillies 8, Los Angeles Dodgers 6. Phillies lead series 1–0.

Basketball
Euroleague:
Regular Season Game 1:
Group C:
Maccabi Tel Aviv  85–65  Union Olimpija Ljubljana

Cricket
Kenya in Zimbabwe:
3rd ODI in Harare:
 266/9 (50 ov);  246 (49.5 ov). Kenya win by 20 runs. Zimbabwe lead the 5-match series 2–1

Gymnastics
World Artistic Gymnastics Championships in London, Great Britain:
Men's All-around Final:  Kōhei Uchimura  91.500 points  Daniel Keatings 88.925   Yury Ryazanov  88.400

Rugby union
Amlin Challenge Cup pool stage, matchday 2:
Pool 3: Toulon  31–23  Saracens

Snooker
Premier League Snooker – League phase in Aberdeen:
Ronnie O'Sullivan  4–2 Shaun Murphy 
John Higgins  3–3 Stephen Hendry 
Standings: Ronnie O'Sullivan 5 points; John Higgins, Judd Trump 4; Stephen Hendry, Neil Robertson 3; Marco Fu 1; Shaun Murphy 0.

Taekwondo
World Championships in Copenhagen, Denmark:
Men's 58 kg:  Joel Gonzalez   Damián Villa   Hasan Rezaï  & Mauro Crismanich 
Women's 49 kg:  Brigitte Yagüe   Anna Soboleva   Wu Jingyu  & Yasmina Aziez 
Women's 57 kg:  Hou Yu   Veronica Calabrese   Andrea Rica  & Tseng Pei-Hua

Volleyball
NORCECA Men's Championship in Bayamón, Puerto Rico:
Quarterfinals:
 3–2 
 3–0

October 14, 2009 (Wednesday)

American football
NCAA:
AP Top 10 (unbeaten team in bold):
(5) Boise State 28, Tulsa 21

Basketball
Africa Championship for Women in Antananarivo, Madagascar: (teams in bold advance to the quarterfinals)
Group A:
 59–71 
 107–19 
 50–64 
Final standings: Senegal 10 points, Mozambique 9, Cameroon 8, Madagascar 7, South Africa 6, Mauritius 5.
Group B:
 66–38 
 60–45 
 60–64 
Final standings: Mali, Côte d'Ivoire, Angola 9 points, Nigeria 7, Tunisia 6, Rwanda 5.

Football (soccer)
2010 FIFA World Cup qualification: (teams in bold qualify for 2010 FIFA World Cup, teams in italics advance to the play-offs)
UEFA:
Group 1:
 4–1 
 4–0 
 0–1 
Final standings: Denmark 21 points, Portugal 19, Sweden 18, Hungary 16.
Group 2:
 3–2 
 2–1 
 0–0 
Final standings: Switzerland 21 points, Greece 20, Latvia 17, Israel 16.
Group 3:
 0–0 
 0–3 
 0–1 
Slovakia qualify for the World Cup for the first time thanks to Seweryn Gancarczyk's own goal in the 3rd minute.
Final standings: Slovakia 22 points, Slovenia 20, Czech Republic 16, Northern Ireland 15.
Group 4:
 1–1 
 1–1 
 0–2 
Final standings: Germany 26 points, Russia 22, Finland 18.
Group 5:
 2–5 
 2–0 
 2–0 
Final standings: Spain 30 points, Bosnia and Herzegovina 19, Turkey 15.
Group 6:
 1–2 
 0–6 
 3–0 
Final standings: England 27 points, Ukraine 21, Croatia 20.
Group 7:
 2–1 
 3–1 
 3–1 
Final standings: Serbia 22 points, France 21, Austria 14.
Group 8:
 3–2 
 0–0 
 6–2 
Final standings: Italy 24 points, Ireland 18, Bulgaria 14.
CONMEBOL round 18:
 1–0 
 0–0 
 1–0 
 0–1 
 0–2 
Final standings: Brazil 34 points, Chile, Paraguay 33, Argentina 28, Uruguay 24, Ecuador, Colombia 23, Venezuela 22, Bolivia 15, Peru 13.
CONCACAF Fourth Round, matchday 10:
 0–1 
 2–2 
 2–2 
Jonathan Bornstein's goal in injury time for USA sends Honduras to the World Cup for the first time since 1982 and Costa Rica to a playoff series against Uruguay.
Final standings: United States 20 points, Mexico 19, Honduras 16 (goal difference +6), Costa Rica 16 (GD 0), El Salvador 8, Trinidad & Tobago 6.
Women's Copa Libertadores in Santos and Guarujá, Brazil:
Group 2:
Universidad Autónoma  4–3  Rampla Juniors
San Lorenzo  1–6  Formas Íntimas
Final standings: Universidad Autónoma 12 points, Formas Íntimas 9,  Deportivo Quito & San Lorenzo 4, Rampla Juniors 0.

Taekwondo
World Championships in Copenhagen, Denmark:
Men's 80 kg:  Steven López   Nicolás García   Rashad Ahmadov  & Sebastien Michaud 
Men's +87 kg:  Daba Modibo Keita   Nam Yun-Bae   Hossein Tajik  & Arman Chilmanov 
Women's 67 kg:  Gwladys Épangue   Taimí Castellanos   Sandra Šarić  & Nikolina Kursar

Volleyball
NORCECA Men's Championship in Bayamón, Puerto Rico: (teams in bold advance to the semifinals, teams in italics advance to the quarterfinals)
Group A:
 3–0 
 0–3 
Final standings: Cuba 6 points, Puerto Rico 5, Dominican Republic 4, Barbados 3.
Group B:
 3–0 
 3–1 
Final standings: USA 6 points, Canada 5, Mexico 4, Panama 3.

October 13, 2009 (Tuesday)

Basketball
Africa Championship for Women in Antananarivo, Madagascar: (teams in bold advance to the quarterfinals)
Group A:
 39–90 
 47–54 
 108–36 
Standings: Senegal 8 points, Mozambique 7, Cameroon, Madagascar 6, South Africa 5, Mauritius 4.
Group B:
 63–51 
 53–59 
 44–41 
Standings: Mali, Côte d'Ivoire, Angola 7 points, Nigeria 6, Tunisia 5, Rwanda 4.

Cricket
Kenya in Zimbabwe:
2nd ODI in Harare:
 263/7 (50 ov);  177 (44.5 ov). Zimbabwe win by 86 runs, lead 5-match series 2–0.

Football (soccer)
U-20 World Cup in Egypt:
Semifinals:
 3–2 
Ghana advance to the final for the 3rd time.
 1–0 
Brazil advance to the final for the 7th time.
Women's Copa Libertadores in Santos and Guarujá, Brazil: (teams in bold advance to the semifinals)
Group 1:
Caracas  2–2  EnForma Santa Cruz
Santos  3–1  Everton
Final standings: Santos 12 points, Everton 7,  White Star 6, Caracas 2,  EnForma Santa Cruz 1.
U.S. national team and FC Sochaux-Montbéliard forward Charlie Davies suffers several broken bones and a lacerated bladder in a car accident near Washington, D.C. that kills a fellow passenger. (AP via Yahoo)

Volleyball
NORCECA Men's Championship in Bayamón, Puerto Rico: (teams in italics advance to the quarterfinals)
Group A:
 0–3 
 0–3 
Standings: Cuba, Puerto Rico 4 points, Dominican Republic, Barbados 2.
Group B:
 1–3 
 0–3 
Standings: USA, Canada 4 points, Mexico, Panama 2.

October 12, 2009 (Monday)

American football
NFL Monday Night Football Week 5:
Miami Dolphins 31, New York Jets 27
 A wild fourth quarter that saw five lead changes is capped off by Ronnie Brown's 2-yard run for the winning touchdown with 6 seconds left.

Baseball
Major League Baseball postseason:
NLDS:
Game 4: Philadelphia Phillies 5, Colorado Rockies 4. Phillies win best-of-5 series 3–1.
With the Phillies 4–2 down and two out in the top of the 9th inning, Ryan Howard hits a 2-run double to even the score, and Jayson Werth singles to bring Howard home for the winning run.

Cricket
Kenya in Zimbabwe:
1st ODI in Harare:
 313/4 (50 ov, Hamilton Masakadza 156);  222 (49.5 ov). Zimbabwe win by 91 runs, lead 5-match series 1–0.

Football (soccer)
Women's Copa Libertadores in Santos and Guarujá, Brazil: (teams in bold advance to the semifinals)
Group 2:
Rampla Juniors  0–4  Deportivo Quito
Universidad Autónoma  4–0  San Lorenzo
Standings: Universidad Autónoma 9 points (3 games), Formas Íntimas 6 (3), San Lorenzo 4 (3), Deportivo Quito 4 (4), Rampla Juniors 0 (3).

Futsal
Confederations Cup in Libya:
 0–1 
Final standings:  Iran 12 points,  Uruguay 6,  Libya 6, Guatemala 4, Solomon Islands 1.

Volleyball
NORCECA Men's Championship in Bayamón, Puerto Rico:
Group A:
 3–0 
 3–0 
Group B:
 3–0 
 3–0

October 11, 2009 (Sunday)

American football
NFL Week 5 (unbeaten teams in bold):
Minnesota Vikings 38, St. Louis Rams 10
New York Giants 44, Oakland Raiders 7
Eli Manning, starting despite plantar fasciitis, becomes the 34th quarterback in NFL history to post a perfect passer rating.
Cincinnati Bengals 17, Baltimore Ravens 14
Carson Palmer connects with Andre Caldwell on the winning 20-yard touchdown pass with 27 seconds left.
Pittsburgh Steelers 28, Detroit Lions 20
Carolina Panthers 20, Washington Redskins 17
Cleveland Browns 6, Buffalo Bills 3
The Browns pick up their first win of the year, thanks to a Billy Cundiff field goal with 26 seconds left.
Philadelphia Eagles 33, Tampa Bay Buccaneers 14
Dallas Cowboys 26, Kansas City Chiefs 20 (OT)
Miles Austin, substituting for the injured Roy Williams, gains 250 of Tony Romo's 351 passing yards, including the game-winning TD.
Seattle Seahawks 41, Jacksonville Jaguars 0
Atlanta Falcons 45, San Francisco 49ers 10
Arizona Cardinals 28, Houston Texans 21
The Cardinals preserve the win with a goal-line stand in the final minute.
Denver Broncos 20, New England Patriots 17 (OT)
Matt Prater's 41-yard field goal keeps the Broncos unbeaten.
Sunday Night Football: Indianapolis Colts 31, Tennessee Titans 9
Peyton Manning becomes only the third quarterback, after Steve Young and Kurt Warner, to throw for 300 or more yards in each of the season's first five games.
Bye week: Chicago Bears, Green Bay Packers, New Orleans Saints, San Diego Chargers

Athletics
Chicago Marathon:
Men:  Samuel Wanjiru  2:05:41
Women:  Liliya Shobukhova  2:25:56

Auto racing
Chase for the Sprint Cup:
Pepsi 500 in Fontana, California:
(1) Jimmie Johnson  (Chevrolet, Hendrick Motorsports) (2) Jeff Gordon  (Chevrolet, Hendrick Motorsports) (3) Juan Pablo Montoya  (Chevrolet, Earnhardt Ganassi Racing)
Drivers' standings (with 6 races remaining): (1) Johnson 5728 points (2) Mark Martin  (Chevrolet, Hendrick Motorsports) 5716 (3) Montoya 5670
V8 Supercars:
Supercheap Auto Bathurst 1000 in Bathurst, New South Wales:
Race 18: (1) Will Davison  & Garth Tander  (Holden Commodore) (2) Jason Richards  & Cameron McConville  (Holden Commodore) (3) Lee Holdsworth  & Michael Caruso  (Holden Commodore)
Drivers' standings (after 18 of 26 races): (1) Jamie Whincup  (Ford Falcon) 2475 points (2) Davison 2382 (3) Tander 2037

Baseball
Major League Baseball postseason (all times EDT):
ALDS:
Game 3: Los Angeles Angels of Anaheim 7, Boston Red Sox 6. Angels win best-of-5 series 3–0.
The Angels, trailing 6–4 with two out in the top of the 9th inning, explode for three runs, capped off by Vladimir Guerrero's two-run single, and close out the Bosox for the series sweep.
Game 3: New York Yankees 4, Minnesota Twins 1. Yankees win best-of-5 series 3–0.
NLDS:
Game 3: Philadelphia Phillies 6, Colorado Rockies 5. Phillies lead best-of-5 series 2–1.

Basketball
Euroleague:
Second preliminary round, game 2: (first leg score in parentheses)
ALBA Berlin  75–70 (70–79)  Maroussi. Maroussi win 149–145 on aggregate.
Africa Championship for Women in Antananarivo, Madagascar: (teams in bold advance to the quarterfinals)
Group A:
 73–101 
 39–68 
 31–121 
Standings: Senegal 6 points, Mozambique, Madagascar 5, Cameroon, South Africa 4, Mauritius 3.
Group B:
 48–72 
 55–65 
 65–49 
Standings: Angola 6 points, Côte d'Ivoire, Mali, Nigeria 5, Tunisia, Rwanda 3.

Football (soccer)
2010 FIFA World Cup qualification: (teams in bold qualify for 2010 FIFA World Cup, teams in italics qualify for 2010 African Cup of Nations)
CONMEBOL round 17:
 2–1 
Standings: Brazil, Paraguay 33 points, Chile 30, Argentina 25, Uruguay 24, Ecuador 23.
CAF Third Round, matchday 5:
Group B:
 1–0 
 1–0 
Standings: Tunisia 11 points, Nigeria 9, Mozambique 4, Kenya 3.
Group C:
 3–1 
Standings: Algeria 13 points, Egypt 10, Zambia 4, Rwanda 1.
Group D:
 1–0 
 1–0 
Standings: Ghana 12 points, Mali 8, Benin 7, Sudan 1.
Group E:
 1–2 
Standings: Côte d'Ivoire 13 points, Burkina Faso 9, Malawi 4, Guinea 3.

Futsal
Confederations Cup in Libya:
 3–4 
Standings: Iran 9 points (3 matches), Uruguay 6 (4), Libya 6 (3), Guatemala 4 (4), Solomon Islands 1 (4).

Golf
PGA Tour:
Presidents Cup in San Francisco, day 4
 Singles matches:
Hunter Mahan  defeats Camilo Villegas (International Team) 2&1
Stewart Cink  defeats Adam Scott (Int) 4&3
Mike Weir (Int) and Justin Leonard  halved
Anthony Kim  defeats Robert Allenby (Int) 5&3
Geoff Ogilvy (Int) defeats Steve Stricker  2&1
Sean O'Hair  defeats Ernie Els (Int) 6&4
Ryo Ishikawa (Int) defeats Kenny Perry  2&1
Tim Clark (Int) defeats Zach Johnson  4&3
Tiger Woods  defeats Y.E. Yang (Int) 6&5
Vijay Singh (Int) and Lucas Glover  halved
Phil Mickelson  defeats Retief Goosen (Int) 2&1
Ángel Cabrera (Int) defeats Jim Furyk  4&3
Final score: U.S. Team 19½–14½ International Team
The United States win the Cup for the third straight time.
European Tour:
Madrid Masters in Madrid, Spain:
Winner: Ross McGowan  263 (−25)
After shooting 60 on Saturday, McGowan eases to a three-shot win over Mikko Ilonen  for his first European Tour title.

Rugby union
Heineken Cup pool stage, matchday 1:
Pool 3: Leicester Tigers  32–32  Ospreys
Pool 5: Toulouse  36–17  Sale Sharks
Amlin Challenge Cup pool stage, matchday 1:
Pool 3: Saracens  36–12  Rovigo
Pool 4: London Wasps  18–13  Racing Métro

Snooker
Grand Prix in Glasgow, Scotland, final: (seeding in parentheses)
Neil Robertson  (9) def. Ding Junhui  (13) 9–4

Tennis
ATP World Tour:
China Open in Beijing, China:
Final: Novak Djokovic  def. Marin Čilić , 6–2, 7–6(4)
Djokovic wins his 3rd title of the year and 14th of his career.
Rakuten Japan Open in Tokyo, Japan:
Final: Jo-Wilfried Tsonga  def. Mikhail Youzhny , 6–3, 6–3
Tsonga wins his 3rd title of the year and 5th of his career.
WTA Tour:
China Open in Beijing, China:
Final: Svetlana Kuznetsova  def. Agnieszka Radwańska , 6–2, 6–4
Kuznetsova wins her 3rd title of the year and 12th of her career.

October 10, 2009 (Saturday)

American football
NCAA:
AP Top 10 (unbeaten teams in bold):
(1) Florida 13, (4) LSU 3
(2) Texas 38, Colorado 14
(3) Alabama 22, (20) Mississippi 3
(5) Virginia Tech 48, Boston College 14
(9) Ohio State 31, Wisconsin 13
(10) TCU 20, Air Force 17
Idle: (6) Boise State, (8) Cincinnati
 Other games:
 Arkansas 44, (17) Auburn 23
Other remaining unbeaten teams (rankings in parentheses):
(12) Iowa, (16) Kansas, (23) South Florida (idle)

Auto racing
IndyCar Series:
Firestone Indy 300 in Homestead, Florida:
(1) Dario Franchitti  (Chip Ganassi Racing) (2) Ryan Briscoe  (Penske Racing) (3) Scott Dixon  (Chip Ganassi Racing)
Franchitti, who needed to win the race to claim the season title, takes advantage of the first caution-free race in the history of the series, and passes Briscoe with seven laps to go after he had to pit for fuel and holds on for the victory.
Final drivers' standings: (1) Franchitti 616 points (2) Dixon 605 (3) Briscoe 604
Nationwide Series:
Copart 300 in Fontana, California:
(1) Joey Logano  (Toyota, Joe Gibbs Racing) (2) Brian Vickers  (Toyota, Braun Racing) (3) Carl Edwards  (Ford, Roush Fenway Racing)

Baseball
Major League Baseball postseason:
NLDS:
Game 3, Los Angeles Dodgers 5, St. Louis Cardinals 1. Dodgers win best-of-5 series 3–0.
Game 3, Philadelphia Phillies at Colorado Rockies, postponed (ice). Best-of-5 series tied 1–1.

Basketball
Africa Championship for Women in Antananarivo, Madagascar:
Group A:
 29–70 
 39–67 
 37–73 
Group B:
 52–62 
 79–49 
 56–62

Cricket
ICC Intercontinental Cup in Kwekwe, day 4:
 333 & 254;  XI 352 & 238/5 (62.5 ov, Vusi Sibanda 116 *). Zimbabwe XI win by 5 wickets.
Standings: Scotland 29 points (2 matches), Kenya 23 (3), Zimbabwe XI, Afghanistan 23 (2), Netherlands 15 (2), Ireland 12 (2), Canada 3 (3).

Football (soccer)
2010 FIFA World Cup qualification: (teams in bold qualify for 2010 FIFA World Cup, teams in italics secure at least a play-off berth)
UEFA:
Group 1:
 1–0 
 3–0 
Standings: Denmark 21 points, Portugal 16, Sweden 15, Hungary 13.
Group 2:
 0–3 
 5–2 
 3–1 
Standings: Switzerland 20 points, Greece 17, Israel 15, Latvia 14.
Group 3:
 0–2 
 2–0 
Standings: Slovakia 19 points, Slovenia 17, Czech Republic 15, Northern Ireland 14.
Group 4:
 2–1 
 0–1 
 0–2 
Standings: Germany 25 points, Russia 21, Finland 17.
Group 5:
 1–2 
 0–2 
 2–0 
Standings: Spain 27 points, Bosnia and Herzegovina 19, Turkey 12.
Group 6:
 4–0 
 1–0 
Standings: England 24 points, Ukraine 18, Croatia 17.
Group 7:
 2–1 
 5–0 
 5–0 
Standings: Serbia 22 points, France 18, Austria 14.
Group 8:
 4–1 
 2–1 
 2–2 
Standings: Italy 21 points, Ireland 17, Bulgaria 11.
CONMEBOL round 17:
 2–4 
 1–2 
 1–2 
 2–1 
Standings: Brazil 33 points (16 matches), Paraguay 33 (17), Chile 30 (17), Argentina 25 (17), Uruguay 24 (17), Ecuador 23 (17), Venezuela 21 (17), Colombia 20 (17).
CAF Third Round, matchday 5:
Group A:
 3–0 
 3–1 
Standings: Cameroon 10 points, Gabon 9, Togo 5, Morocco 3.
Group C:
 0–1 
Standings: Algeria 10 points (4 matches), Egypt 10 (5), Zambia 4 (5), Rwanda 1 (4).
Group E:
 1–1 
Standings: Côte d'Ivoire 13 points (5 matches), Burkina Faso 6 (4), Malawi 4 (5), Guinea 3 (4).
CONCACAF Fourth Round, matchday 9:
 4–1 
 4–0 
 2–3 
Standings: United States 19 points, Mexico 18, Costa Rica 15, Honduras 13, El Salvador 8, Trinidad & Tobago 5.
OFC / AFC Intercontinental Playoffs, first leg:
 0–0 
U-20 World Cup in Egypt:
Quarterfinals:
 2–1 (ET) 
 1–2 (ET) 
CAF Champions League semifinals, second leg: (first leg score in parentheses)
Kano Pillars  0–1 (0–4)  Heartland. Heartland win 5–0 on aggregate.
Women's Copa Libertadores in Santos and Guarujá, Brazil:
Group 1:
EnForma Santa Cruz  2–4  White Star
Santos  11–0  Caracas
Standings: Santos 9 points (3), Everton 7 (3), White Star 6 (4), Caracas 1 (3), EnForma Santa Cruz 0 (3).
Group 2:
Deportivo Quito  1–4  Universidad Autónoma
Formas Íntimas  5–0  Rampla Juniors
Standings: Formas Íntimas 6 points (3 matches), Universidad Autónoma 6 (2), San Lorenzo 4 (2) Deportivo Quito 1 (3), Rampla Juniors 0 (2).

Futsal
Confederations Cup in Libya:
 0–6 
 2–3 
Standings: Iran 9 points (3 matches), Uruguay, Libya 6 (3), Guatemala 1 (3), Solomon Islands 1 (4).

Golf
PGA Tour:
Presidents Cup in San Francisco, day 3:
Morning foursomes:
Phil Mickelson/Sean O'Hair  defeat Retief Goosen/Camilo Villegas (International Team) 5&3
Jim Furyk/Justin Leonard  defeat Ernie Els/Adam Scott (Int) 4&2
Robert Allenby/Vijay Singh (Int) and Stewart Cink/Hunter Mahan  halved
Steve Stricker/Tiger Woods  defeat Tim Clark/Mike Weir (Int) 1 up
Ryo Ishikawa/Y.E. Yang (Int) defeat Zach Johnson/Kenny Perry  3&2
Score after morning session: U.S. Team 10–7 International Team
Afternoon four-balls:
Jim Furyk/Anthony Kim  defeat Ángel Cabrera/Adam Scott (International Team) 2 up
Robert Allenby/Geoff Ogilvy (Int) defeat Stewart Cink/Lucas Glover  2&1
Ernie Els/Mike Weir (Int) defeat Zach Johnson/Justin Leonard  5&3
Steve Stricker/Tiger Woods  defeat Ryo Ishikawa/Y.E. Yang (Int) 4&2
Tim Clark/Vijay Singh (Int) and Phil Mickelson/Sean O'Hair  halved
Score: U.S. Team 12½–9½ International Team

Rugby league
Super League Grand Final at Old Trafford:
Leeds Rhinos 18–10 St. Helens
 Leeds become the first club to claim three consecutive Super League titles.

Rugby union
Heineken Cup pool stage, matchday 1:
Pool 1:
Benetton Treviso  9–8  Perpignan
Northampton Saints  31–27  (Ireland) Munster
Pool 2: Glasgow Warriors  18–22  Biarritz
Pool 3: Clermont Auvergne  36–18  Viadana
Pool 4: Stade Français  31–7  Edinburgh
Pool 5: Cardiff Blues  20–6  Harlequins
Pool 6: Scarlets  24–12  Brive
Amlin Challenge Cup pool stage, matchday 1:
Pool 1: București Oaks  21–9  Overmach Parma
Pool 5: Petrarca Padova  27–29  Newcastle Falcons

Snooker
Grand Prix in Glasgow, Scotland, semi-finals: (seeding in parentheses)
Neil Robertson  (9) def. John Higgins  (1) 6–5
Ding Junhui  (13) def. Mark Williams  (15) 6–1

October 9, 2009 (Friday)

Baseball
Major League Baseball postseason:
ALDS:
Game 2: New York Yankees 4, Minnesota Twins 3 (11 innings). Yankees lead best-of-5 series 2–0.
 Alex Rodriguez ties the game with a two-run homer in the 9th inning, and Mark Teixeira ends it with a walk-off homer.
Game 2: Los Angeles Angels of Anaheim 4, Boston Red Sox 1. Angels lead best-of-5 series 2–0.

Basketball
WNBA Finals:
Game 5 at Phoenix: (W1) Phoenix Mercury 94, (E1) Indiana Fever 86. Mercury win series 3–2.
 League MVP Diana Taurasi leads the Mercury to their second title in three years with 26 points, with Cappie Pondexter adding 24. Taurasi is also named Finals MVP.
Euroleague:
Second preliminary round, game 2: (first leg score in parentheses)
Orléans  80–82 (82–73)  Benetton Treviso. Orléans win 162–155 on aggregate.
Africa Championship for Women in Antananarivo, Madagascar:
Group A:
 55–48 
 75–34 
 42–86 
Group B:
 66–54 
 50–62 
 37–41

Cricket
ICC Intercontinental Cup in Kwekwe, day 3:
 333 & 254 (74.3 ov);  XI 352 (103.5 ov, Vusi Sibanda 209). Zimbabwe require 236 runs with 10 wickets remaining.

Football (soccer)
U-20 World Cup in Egypt:
Quarterfinals:
 2–3 
 2–3 (ET)

Futsal
Confederations Cup in Libya:
 4–2 
 6–6 
Standings: Iran, Libya 6 points (2 matches), Uruguay 3 (2), Guatemala, Solomon Islands 1 (3).

Golf
PGA Tour:
Presidents Cup in San Francisco, day 2:
Four-balls:
Phil Mickelson/Justin Leonard  defeat Retief Goosen/Adam Scott (International Team) 3 & 2
Ernie Els/Mike Weir (Int) defeat Jim Furyk/Anthony Kim  2 up
Ryo Ishikawa/Y.E. Yang (Int) defeat Kenny Perry/Sean O'Hair  4 & 3
Vijay Singh/Tim Clark (Int) defeat Lucas Glover/Stewart Cink  1 up
Zach Johnson/Hunter Mahan  defeat Robert Allenby/Camilo Villegas (Int) 2 & 1
Tiger Woods/Steve Stricker  defeat Geoff Ogilvy/Ángel Cabrera (Int) 5 & 3
 Score: U.S. Team 6½–5½ International Team

Olympic Games
 The International Olympic Committee, following the previous recommendation of its executive board, votes to add golf and rugby union (specifically rugby sevens) to the Olympic program for the 2016 Games in Rio de Janeiro. (AP via ESPN)

Rugby union
Heineken Cup pool stage, matchday 1:
Pool 2: Gloucester  19–17  Newport Gwent Dragons
Pool 4: Ulster (Ireland) 26–12  Bath
Pool 6: Leinster (Ireland) 9–12  London Irish
Amlin Challenge Cup pool stage, matchday 1:
Pool 1: Bourgoin  29–19  Leeds Carnegie
Pool 2: Connacht (Ireland) 46–6  Olympus Madrid
Pool 3: Castres Olympique  17–33  Toulon
Pool 4: Bayonne  61–3  Rugby Roma
Pool 5: Albi  7–17  Montauban

Snooker
Grand Prix in Glasgow, Scotland, quarter-finals: (seeding in parentheses)
John Higgins  (1) def. Mark Allen  (11) 5–1
Neil Robertson  (9) def. Joe Perry  (12) 5–1
Ding Junhui  (13) def. Peter Ebdon  (14) 5–2
Mark Williams  (15) def. Robert Milkins  5–2

October 8, 2009 (Thursday)

American football
NCAA:
AP Top 25:
(21) Nebraska 27, (24) Missouri 12

Baseball
Major League Baseball postseason:
ALDS:
Game 1: Los Angeles Angels of Anaheim 5, Boston Red Sox 0. Angels lead best-of-5 series 1–0.
NLDS:
Game 2: Colorado Rockies 5, Philadelphia Phillies 4. Best-of-5 series tied 1–1.
Game 2, Los Angeles Dodgers 3, St. Louis Cardinals 2. Dodgers lead best-of-5 series 2–0.
The Dodgers rally from 2–1 down with 2 outs and no one on base in the 9th inning, starting with a Matt Holliday error that extends the inning.

Basketball
UAAP at Quezon City:
Men's Finals: Ateneo Blue Eagles 71, UE Red Warriors 58, Ateneo win best-of-3 series 2–1
Ateneo clinch their second consecutive, fifth UAAP and nineteenth men's championship, and extend UE's title drought to 25 years.
Juniors' Finals: Ateneo Blue Eaglets 61, De La Salle Junior Archers 56, Ateneo win best-of-3 series 2–1
Ateneo win their second consecutive, fifteenth UAAP and 24th juniors' championship, preventing La Salle from their "alternating" championship reigns with Ateneo.
Winner Cup Final in Jerusalem:
Hapoel Jerusalem 86–80 Maccabi Tel Aviv

Cricket
ICC Intercontinental Cup in Kwekwe, day 2:
 333 (92.3 ov);  XI 320/7 (91.0 ov, Vusi Sibanda 174*). Zimbabwe XI trail by 13 runs with 3 wickets remaining in the 1st innings.

Fencing
World Championships in Antalya, Turkey:
Men's Team Sabre:   (Rareș Dumitrescu, Florin Zalomir, Tiberiu Dolniceanu, Cosmin Hănceanu)   (Aldo Montano, Luigi Tarantino, Diego Occhiuzzi, Giampiero Pastore)   (Tamás Decsi, Nikolász Iliász, Balázs Lontay, Áron Szilágyi)
Women's Team Épée:   (Francesca Quondamcarlo, Cristiana Cascioli, Bianca Del Carretto, Nathalie Moellhausen)   (Danuta Dmowska-Andrzejuk, Małgorzata Bereza, Magdalena Piekarska, Ewa Nelip)   (Imke Duplitzer, Britta Heidemann, Marijana Markovic, Monika Sozanska)

Football (soccer)
Women's Copa Libertadores in Santos and Guarujá, Brazil:
Group 1:
White Star  1–0  Caracas
Everton  5–0  EnForma Santa Cruz
Standings: Everton 7 points (3 matches), Santos 6 (2), White Star 3 (3), Caracas 1 (2), EnForma Santa Cruz 0 (2).

Futsal
Confederations Cup in Libya:
 3–2 
Standings: Libya 6 points (2 matches), Uruguay, Iran 3 (1), Guatemala, Solomon Islands 0 (2).

Golf
PGA Tour:
Presidents Cup in San Francisco, day 1:
Foursomes:
Phil Mickelson/Anthony Kim  defeat Mike Weir/Tim Clark (International Team) 3&2
Adam Scott/Ernie Els (Int) defeat Hunter Mahan/Sean O'Hair  2&1
Vijay Singh/Robert Allenby (Int) defeat Lucas Glover/Stewart Cink  1 up
Kenny Perry/Zach Johnson  defeat Ángel Cabrera/Camilo Villegas (Int) 2 up
Tiger Woods/Steve Stricker  defeat Geoff Ogilvy/Ryo Ishikawa (Int) 6&4
Retief Goosen/Y.E. Yang (Int) and Jim Furyk/Justin Leonard  halved
 Score: U.S. Team 3½–2½ International Team

Rugby union
Amlin Challenge Cup pool stage, matchday 1:
Pool 2: Worcester Warriors  17–22  Montpellier

Snooker
Grand Prix in Glasgow, Scotland, round 2: (seeding in parentheses)
Mark Williams  (15) def. Stephen Hendry  (10) 5–2
Peter Ebdon  (14) def. Mark Davis  5–3
Ding Junhui  (13) def. Stephen Maguire  (3) 5–1
Robert Milkins  def. Mark King  (16) 5–1

Volleyball
Women's African Championship in Batna, Algeria:
 3–0 
 3–0 
 3–0 
Final standings: Algeria 10 points, Tunisia 9, Cameroon 8, Senegal 7, Botswana 6, Morocco 5.
Algeria win the title for the first time.

October 7, 2009 (Wednesday)

Baseball
Major League Baseball postseason:
ALDS:
Game 1: New York Yankees 7, Minnesota Twins 2. Yankees lead best-of-5 series 1–0.
NLDS:
Game 1: Philadelphia Phillies 5, Colorado Rockies 1. Phillies lead best-of-5 series 1–0.
Game 1: Los Angeles Dodgers 5, St. Louis Cardinals 3. Dodgers lead best-of-5 series 1–0.

Basketball
WNBA Finals:
Game 4 at Indianapolis: (W1) Phoenix Mercury 90, (E1) Indiana Fever 77. Best-of-5 series tied 2–2.

Cricket
ICC Intercontinental Cup in Kwekwe, day 1:
 327/9 (91.0 ov) v  XI

Fencing
World Championships in Antalya, Turkey:
Men's Team Épée:   (Jérôme Jeannet, Ulrich Robeiri, Jean-Michel Lucenay, Gauthier Grumier)   (Péter Somfai, András Rédli, Géza Imre, Gábor Boczkó)   Krzysztof Mikołajczak, Tomasz Motyka, Radosław Zawrotniak, Adam Wiercioch
Women's Team Foil:   (Valentina Vezzali, Margherita Granbassi, Arianna Errigo, Elisa Di Francisca)   (Aida Shanaeva, Larisa Korobeynikova, Yuliya Biryukova, Kamilla Gafurzianova)   (Maria Bartkowski, Katja Wächter, Anja Schache, Carolin Golubytskyi)

Football (soccer)
U-20 World Cup in Egypt:
Round of 16:
 3–1 
 1–2 
 3–2 
UEFA Women's Champions League Round of 32, second leg: (first leg score in parentheses)
Montpellier  3–1 (0–0)  Standard Liège. Montpellier win 3–1 on aggregate.
Neulengbach  0–1 (3–1)  Unia Racibórz. Neulengbach win 3–2 on aggregate.
Valur  1–2 (1–4)  Torres. Torres  win 6–2 on aggregate.
Umeå  6–0 (5–0)  Zhilstroy-1. Umeå win 11–0 on aggregate.
Brøndby  1–1 (2–1)  AZ. Brøndby win 3–2 on aggregate.
Sparta Praha  2–0 (0–1)  Alma. Sparta Praha win 2–1 on aggregate.
Lyon  5–0 (1–0)  Mašinac Niš. Lyon win 6–0 on aggregate.
Duisburg  6–3 (5–1)  Universitet Vitebsk. Duisburg win 11–4 on aggregate.
Rossiyanka  2–1 (3–1)  Rayo Vallecano. Rossiyanka win 5–2 on aggregate.
Bayern Munich  4–2 (5–0)  Viktória. Bayern Munich win 9–2 on aggregate.
Zvezda 2005 Perm  5–0 (3–0)  ZNK-SFK 2000. Zvezda 2005 Perm win 8–0 on aggregate.
Turbine Potsdam  8–0 (8–1)  Honka. Turbine Potsdam win 16–1 on aggregate.
Arsenal  9–0 (9–0)  PAOK. Arsenal win 18–0 on aggregate.
Everton  2–0 (0–3)  Røa IL. Røa IL win 3–2 on aggregate.
Linköping  3–0 (2–0)  Zürich. Linköping win 5–0 on aggregate.
Bardolino  2–1 (0–4)  Fortuna Hjørring. Fortuna Hjørring win 5–2 on aggregate.
Women's Copa Libertadores in Santos and Guarujá, Brazil:
Group 2:
Deportivo Quito  1–5  Formas Íntimas
Rampla Juniors  2–5  San Lorenzo
Standings: San Lorenzo 4 points (2 matches), Formas Íntimas 3 (2), Universidad Autónoma 3 (1), Deportivo Quito 1 (2), Rampla Juniors 0 (2).

Futsal
Confederations Cup in Libya:
 4–2 
 1–11

Snooker
Grand Prix in Glasgow, Scotland, round 2: (seeding in parentheses)
John Higgins  (1) def. Ronnie O'Sullivan  (2) 5–4
Mark Allen  (11) def. Jamie Cope  5–3
Neil Robertson  (9) def. Ken Doherty  5–2
Joe Perry  (12) def. Barry Pinches  5–2

Volleyball
Women's African Championship in Batna, Algeria:
 3–1 
 3–1 
 3–0 
Standings: Algeria 8 points, Tunisia 7, Cameroon, Senegal 6, Botswana 5, Morocco 4.

October 6, 2009 (Tuesday)

Baseball
Major League Baseball:
American League Central Division one-game playoff:
Minnesota Twins 6, Detroit Tigers 5 (12 innings)
Alexi Casilla hits a single in the 12th and drives in Carlos Gómez with the winning run, in the last regular season game at the Metrodome. The Twins become the first team in MLB history to rally from 3 games down with 4 left, and will next play the New York Yankees in the Division Series, starting on Wednesday at Yankee Stadium.
Other news:
 MLB owners unanimously approve the sale of the Chicago Cubs from the Tribune Company to the family of TD Ameritrade founder Joe Ricketts, with his son Tom having day-to-day control. (AP via ESPN)

Basketball
Euroleague:
Second preliminary round, game 1:
Benetton Treviso  73–82  Orléans
Maroussi  79–70  ALBA Berlin

Fencing
World Championships in Antalya, Turkey:
Men's Team Foil:   (Andrea Baldini, Andrea Cassarà, Stefano Barrera, Simone Vanni)   (Peter Joppich, Benjamin Kleibrink, André Weßels, Sebastian Bachmann)   (Aleksandr Stukalin, Artem Sedov, Renal Ganeyev, Aleksey Khovanskiy)
Women's Team Sabre:   (Olha Kharlan, Olena Khomrova, Olha Zhovnir, Halyna Pundyk)   (Cécilia Berder, Léonore Perrus, Carole Vergne, Solenne Mary)   (Bao Yingying, Li Fei, Ni Hong, Chen Xiaodong)

Football (soccer)
U-20 World Cup in Egypt:
Round of 16:
 2–1 (ET) 
 0–2 
 2–2 (4–3 pen.) 
Women's Copa Libertadores in Santos and Guarujá, Brazil:
Group 1:
White Star  1–4  Everton
Santos  12–0  EnForma Santa Cruz
Standings: Santos 6 points (2 matches), Everton 4 (2), Caracas 1 (1), White Star 0 (2), EnForma Santa Cruz 0 (1).
Francophone Games in Beirut, Lebanon:
Final:   0–0 (3–5 pen.)

Futsal
Confederations Cup in Libya:
 6–5

Snooker
Grand Prix in Glasgow, Scotland, round 1: (seeding in parentheses)
Ronnie O'Sullivan  (2) def. Jamie Burnett  5–3
Mark Williams  (15) def. Stuart Bingham  5–0
Stephen Maguire  (3) def. Nigel Bond   5–3
Mark King  (16) def. Ricky Walden  5–4

October 5, 2009 (Monday)

American football
NFL Monday Night Football Week 4 (unbeaten team in bold):
Minnesota Vikings 30, Green Bay Packers 23
 In his first game against his longtime team, Brett Favre throws for three touchdowns, while the Vikings sack his counterpart Aaron Rodgers eight times.

Cricket
ICC Champions Trophy in South Africa:
Final at Centurion:
 200/9 (50 ov);  206/4 (45.2 ov, Shane Watson 105*). Australia win by 6 wickets.
Australia retain the Trophy and become the first team to win it twice.

Fencing
World Championships in Antalya, Turkey:
Men's Sabre:  Nicolas Limbach   Rareș Dumitrescu   Tamás Decsi  & Luigi Tarantino 
Women's Épée:  Lyubov Shutova   Sherraine Schalm   Sonja Tol  & Anfisa Pochkalova

Football (soccer)
U-20 World Cup in Egypt:
Round of 16:
 1–3 
 0–3 
Women's Copa Libertadores in Santos and Guarujá, Brazil:
Group 2:
Universidad Autónoma  3–2  Formas Íntimas
San Lorenzo  1–1  Deportivo Quito
Francophone Games in Beirut, Lebanon:
Bronze medal match:   3–1

Golf
PGA Tour:
Fall Series:
Turning Stone Resort Championship in Verona, New York:
 Winner: Matt Kuchar   271 (−17) PO
 Kuchar defeats Vaughn Taylor  on the sixth playoff hole and wins on tour for the first time since 2002.
European Tour:
Alfred Dunhill Links Championship in Scotland:
 Winner: Simon Dyson   268 (−20)

Snooker
Grand Prix in Glasgow, Scotland, round 1: (seeding in parentheses)
Stephen Hendry  (10) def. Matthew Selt  5–2
Peter Ebdon  (14) def. Liang Wenbo  5–2
Barry Pinches  def. Shaun Murphy  (4) 5–4
Mark Allen  (11) def. Ian McCulloch  5–3

Volleyball
Asian Men's Championship in Manila, Philippines:
Seventh place match:  3–0 
Fifth place match:  3–1 
Bronze medal match:   3–1 
Final:   1–3  
Japan win the title for the seventh time. Iran qualify for the World Grand Champions Cup as Asia representative because Japan has already qualified as host.
Women's African Championship in Batna, Algeria:
 3–0 
 3–0 
 3–0 
Standings: Tunisia, Algeria 6 points, Cameroon, Botswana, Senegal 4, Morocco 3.

October 4, 2009 (Sunday)

American football
NFL Week 4 (unbeaten teams in bold):
Washington Redskins 16, Tampa Bay Buccaneers 13
Indianapolis Colts 34, Seattle Seahawks 17
 Peyton Manning leads the Colts to 4–0, throwing for 353 yards and two touchdowns.
Jacksonville Jaguars 37, Tennessee Titans 17
 David Garrard throws for 323 yards and three TDs for the Jags.
Chicago Bears 48, Detroit Lions 24
New York Giants 27, Kansas City Chiefs 16
Houston Texans 29, Oakland Raiders 6
New England Patriots 27, Baltimore Ravens 21
Cincinnati Bengals 23, Cleveland Browns 20 (OT)
 Shayne Graham's 31-yard field goal with 7 seconds left in overtime sends the Bengals to 3–1.
Miami Dolphins 38, Buffalo Bills 10
New Orleans Saints 24, New York Jets 10
 The Saints go to 4–0 for the first time since 1993 with defense, scoring TDs off a Mark Sanchez interception and a fumble recovery.
San Francisco 49ers 35, St. Louis Rams 0
 The Niners score three defensive TDs.
Denver Broncos 17, Dallas Cowboys 10
 Champ Bailey breaks up a potential tying TD pass with 1 second left to keep the Broncos unbeaten.
Sunday Night Football: Pittsburgh Steelers 38, San Diego Chargers 28
 The Steelers are led by Ben Roethlisberger with 333 yards and two TDs passing and Rashard Mendenhall's 165 yards and two TDs rushing.
Bye week: Arizona Cardinals, Atlanta Falcons, Carolina Panthers, Philadelphia Eagles

Auto racing
Formula One:
Japanese Grand Prix in Suzuka:
(1) Sebastian Vettel  (Red Bull–Renault) 1:28:20.443 (2) Jarno Trulli  (Toyota) +4.877 (3) Lewis Hamilton  (McLaren–Mercedes) +6.472
Drivers' standings (after 15 of 17 races): (1) Jenson Button  (Brawn-Mercedes) 85 points (2) Rubens Barrichello  (Brawn-Mercedes) 71 (3) Vettel 69
Constructors' standings: (1) Brawn-Mercedes 156 (2) Red Bull-Renault 120.5 (3) Ferrari 67
Chase for the Sprint Cup:
Price Chopper 400 in Kansas City, Kansas:
(1) Tony Stewart  (Chevrolet, Stewart Haas Racing) (2) Jeff Gordon  (Chevrolet, Hendrick Motorsports) (3) Greg Biffle  (Ford, Roush Fenway Racing)
Drivers' standings (with 7 races remaining): (1) Mark Martin  (Chevrolet, Hendrick Motorsports) 5551 points (2) Jimmie Johnson  (Chevrolet, Hendrick Motorsports) 5533 (3) Juan Pablo Montoya  (Chevrolet, Earnhardt Ganassi Racing) 5500
World Rally Championship:
Rally Catalunya:
(1) Sébastien Loeb  (Citroën C4 WRC) 3:22:14.7 (2) Dani Sordo  (Citroën C4 WRC) +12.0 (3) Mikko Hirvonen  (Ford Focus RS WRC 09) +54.1
Drivers' championship (after 11 of 12 races): (1) Hirvonen 84 points (2) Loeb 83 (3) Sordo 58
Manufacturers' championship: (1) Citroën Total 151 points (2) BP Ford Abu Dhabi 130 (3) Stobart VK M-Sport Ford 73

Baseball
Major League Baseball Final day of regular season: (teams in italics tie for division title)
American League:
Detroit Tigers 5, Chicago White Sox 3
Minnesota Twins 13, Kansas City Royals 4
The Tigers and Twins finish in a tie for the Central Division title. They will play a one-game playoff on October 6 at the Metrodome, which will be the last regular-season game there. The Twins become the first team in MLB history to play a one-game playoff two straight years.
 Alex Rodriguez sets an AL record for RBI in an inning with 7, hitting two homers, one of them a grand slam, in the sixth inning of the New York Yankees' 10–2 win over the Tampa Bay Rays. With his second homer, Rodriguez becomes the first player in MLB history to hit 30 HRs and 100 RBIs in 13 seasons.

Basketball
WNBA Finals:
Game 3 at Indianapolis: (E1) Indiana Fever 86, (W1) Phoenix Mercury 85. Fever lead best-of-5 series 2–1.

Fencing
World Championships in Antalya, Turkey:
Men's Épée:  Anton Avdeev   Matteo Tagliariol   Jose Luis Abajo  & Jérôme Jeannet 
Women's Foil:  Aida Shanaeva   Jeon Hee Sook   Arianna Errigo  & Elisa Di Francisca

Football (soccer)
CAF Champions League semifinals, first leg:
Heartland  4–0  Kano Pillars
Al-Hilal  2–5  TP Mazembe
Women's Copa Libertadores in Santos and Guarujá, Brazil:
Group 1: Caracas  0–0  Everton

Golf
Senior majors:
Constellation Energy Senior Players Championship in Timonium, Maryland:
 (1) Jay Haas  267 (−13) (2) Tom Watson  268 (−12) (3) Loren Roberts & Mark Wiebe (both United States) 273 (−7)
 Haas' final-round 64 enables him to chase down Watson for his third senior major.
PGA Tour:
Fall Series:
Turning Stone Resort Championship in Verona, New York:
 Tied for lead: Matt Kuchar & Vaughn Taylor (both United States) 271 (−17); playoff called off after two holes due to darkness and will resume Monday
European Tour:
Alfred Dunhill Links Championship in Scotland:
 Play was called off on Saturday due to gale-force winds at all three courses hosting the event. The third round was played today, and the final round will be played at St Andrews on Monday.
LPGA Tour:
Navistar LPGA Classic in Prattville, Alabama:
 Winner: Lorena Ochoa  270 (−18)

Horse racing
Prix de l'Arc de Triomphe in Paris
Winner: Sea the Stars  (jockey: Michael Kinane, trainer: John Oxx)
Sea the Stars becomes the first horse ever to win the 2,000 Guineas, Epsom Derby, and the Arc.

Motorcycle racing
Moto GP:
Portuguese Grand Prix in Estoril
(1) Jorge Lorenzo  (Yamaha) 45:35.522 (2) Casey Stoner  (Ducati) +6.294 (3) Dani Pedrosa  (Honda) +9.889
Drivers' standings (after 14 of 17 races): (1) Valentino Rossi  (Yamaha) 250 points (2) Lorenzo 232 (3) Pedrosa 175
Manufacturers' standings: (1) Yamaha 330 (2) Honda 236 (3) Ducati 211
Superbike:
Magny-Cours Superbike World Championship round in Magny-Cours, France
Race 1: (1) Ben Spies  (Yamaha) 37:57.110 (2) Noriyuki Haga  (Ducati) +0.181 (3) Max Biaggi  (Aprilia) +5.009
Race 2: (1) Haga 38:00.282 (2) Biaggi +1.480 (3) Jonathan Rea  (Honda) +6.024
Riders' standings (after 13 of 14 rounds): (1) Haga 436 points (2) Spies 426 (3) Michel Fabrizio  (Ducati) 346
Manufacturers' standings: (1) Ducati 534 points (2) Yamaha 469 (3) Honda 395

Rugby league
NRL Finals Series:
Grand Final in Sydney:
Parramatta Eels 16–23 Melbourne Storm
The Storm win the premiership for the third time.

Snooker
Grand Prix in Glasgow, Scotland, round 1: (seeding in parentheses)
Robert Milkins  def. Ali Carter  (5) 5–1
Ding Junhui  (13) def. Matthew Stevens  5–4
Jamie Cope  def. Ryan Day  (6) 5–3
Neil Robertson  (9) def. Gerard Greene  5–3

Tennis
ATP World Tour:
PTT Thailand Open in Bangkok, Thailand:
Final: Gilles Simon  def. Viktor Troicki  7–5, 6–3
Simon wins his first title of the year and 6th of his career.
Malaysian Open in Kuala Lumpur, Malaysia:
Final: Nikolay Davydenko  def. Fernando Verdasco  6–4, 7–5
Davydenko wins his third title of the year and 17th of his career.

Volleyball
European Women's Championship in Poland:
Bronze medal match:   3–0 
Final:   0–3  
Italy win the title for the second straight time and qualify for the World Grand Champions Cup.
Asian Men's Championship in Manila, Philippines:
Semifinals:
 3–2 
 3–2 
Classification 5th–8th:
 3–2 
 3–2 
South American Women's Championship in Porto Alegre, Brazil:
Bronze medal match:  1–3  
Final:   3–0  
Brazil win the title for the eighth straight time and 16th overall, and qualify for the World Grand Champions Cup.
African Men's Championship in Tétouan, Morocco:
Seventh place match:  2–3 
Fifth place match:  1–3 
Bronze medal match:   3–1 
Final:   0–3  
Egypt win the title for the third successive time and fifth overall, and qualify for the World Grand Champions Cup.
Women's African Championship in Batna, Algeria:
 1–3 
 0–3 
 3–0

October 3, 2009 (Saturday)

American football
NCAA:
AP Top 10 (unbeaten teams in bold):
(3) Alabama 38, Kentucky 20
(4) LSU 20, (18) Georgia 13
(5) Boise State 34, UC Davis 16
(6) Virginia Tech 34, Duke 26
(7) USC 30, (24) California 3
(17) Miami (FL) 21, (8) Oklahoma 20
(9) Ohio State 33, Indiana 14
Victory Bell: (10) Cincinnati 37, Miami (OH) 13
Idle: (1) Florida, (2) Texas
Other games:
 UTEP 58, (12) Houston 41
 Paul Bunyan Trophy: Michigan State 26, (22) Michigan 20 (OT)
Other remaining unbeaten teams (rankings in parentheses):
(11) TCU, (13) Iowa, (18) Kansas (idle), Auburn, Missouri (idle), South Florida, Wisconsin

Auto racing
Nationwide Series:
Kansas Lottery 300 in Kansas City, Kansas:
 (1) Joey Logano  (Toyota, Joe Gibbs Racing) (2) Kyle Busch  (Toyota, Joe Gibbs Racing) (3) Brad Keselowski  (Chevrolet, JR Motorsports)

Baseball
Major League Baseball (teams in bold have clinched division title, teams in italics have clinched a wild card berth):
American League:
Minnesota Twins 5, Kansas City Royals 4
Chicago White Sox 5, Detroit Tigers 1
The Twins move into a tie with the Tigers for the Central Division title with one game remaining.
National League:
Milwaukee Brewers 5, St. Louis Cardinals 4
Florida Marlins 4, Philadelphia Phillies 3
Los Angeles Dodgers 5, Colorado Rockies 0
 The National League's postseason matchups are decided. The Dodgers secure the West Division title and the NL's best record with their win, and have home advantage in the NLCS if they get there. The Cards' loss gives the Phillies the #2 seed in the NL playoffs. The Division Series will pit the Dodgers against the Cardinals and the Phils against the Rockies.
Other news:
Two teams, one in each league, fire their general managers. The Toronto Blue Jays fire J. P. Ricciardi after eight seasons, and the San Diego Padres ax Kevin Towers, who had been the longest-tenured GM in the majors at 14 seasons. (Ricciardi – AP via ESPN) (Towers – ESPN)

Cricket
ICC Champions Trophy in South Africa:
2nd Semi-Final at Johannesburg:
 233/9 (50 ov),  234/5 (47.5 ov). New Zealand win by 5 wickets.
 The Black Caps advance to the final against  on October 5.

Fencing
World Championships in Antalya, Turkey:
Men's Foil:  Andrea Baldini   Zhu Jun   Peter Joppich  & Artem Sedov 
Women's Sabre:  Mariel Zagunis   Olga Kharlan   Carole Vergne  & Orsolya Nagy

Football (soccer)
U-20 World Cup in Egypt: (teams in bold advance to the round of 16)
Group E:
 2–3 
Australia  1–3 
Final standings: Brazil, Czech Republic 7 points, Costa Rica 3, Australia 0.
Costa Rica advance as one of the best four 3rd place teams, and eliminate the United States.
Group F:
 2–0 
 2–0 
Final standings: Hungary 6 points, United Arab Emirates, South Africa 4, Honduras 3.
CAF Confederation Cup Semifinals, first leg:
Bayelsa United  1–1  ES Sétif
ENPPI  2–2  Stade Malien
Women's Copa Libertadores in Santos and Guarujá, Brazil:
Group 1: Santos  3–1  White Star

Rugby league
Super League play-offs:
Qualifying Semi-Final 2:
St. Helens  14–10  Wigan Warriors
The Saints advance to the Grand Final for the fourth successive time to play the Leeds Rhinos.

Snooker
Grand Prix in Glasgow, Scotland, round 1: (seeding in parentheses)
John Higgins  (1) def. Mark Joyce  5–1
Mark Davis  def. Marco Fu  (8) 5–4
Ken Doherty  def. Mark Selby  (7) 5–3
Joe Perry  (12) def. Marcus Campbell  5–2

Tennis
WTA Tour:
Toray Pan Pacific Open in Tokyo, Japan:
Final: Maria Sharapova  def. Jelena Janković  5–2, Ret.
Sharapova wins her 20th career title and her first since April 2008.

Volleyball
European Women's Championship in Poland:
Semifinals:
 3–1 
 3–1 
Asian Men's Championship in Manila, Philippines: (teams in bold advance to the semifinals)
Pool E:
 1–3 
 1–3 
Final standings: Iran 6 points, China 5, Kazakhstan 4, Chinese Taipei 3.
Pool F:
 3–2 
 3–0 
Final standings: Japan 6 points, South Korea 5, Indonesia 4, Australia 3.
South American Women's Championship in Porto Alegre, Brazil:
Semifinals:
 3–0 
 1–3 
Fifth place match:  3–2 
Seventh place match:  0–3 
African Men's Championship in Tétouan, Morocco:
Semifinals:
 2–3 
 3–0 
Classification 5th–8th:
 3–2 
 3–0 
Women's African Championship in Batna, Algeria:
 3–1 
 3–0 
 3–1

October 2, 2009 (Friday)

Baseball
Major League Baseball (teams in bold have clinched division title, teams in italics have clinched at least a wild card berth):
American League:
Chicago White Sox 8, Detroit Tigers 0
Minnesota Twins 10, Kansas City Royals 7
The Twins pull to within 1 game of the Tigers in the Central Division race, with 2 games left.
National League:
Colorado Rockies 4, Los Angeles Dodgers 3
The Rockies stay alive in the West Division race, but still must beat the Dodgers in both of their remaining games to win the title.
Florida Marlins 7, Philadelphia Phillies 2
Milwaukee Brewers 12, St. Louis Cardinals 6
The Cards are now out of the race for the NL's best record, but remain in the hunt for home advantage in the Division Series, 1 game behind the Phils.

Basketball
Euroleague:
First preliminary round, game 2: (first leg score in parentheses)
Orléans  81–56 (53–55)  Charleroi. Orléans win 134–111 on aggregate.
Benetton Treviso  88–76 (73–78)  Ventspils. Benetton Treviso win 161–154 on aggregate.
ALBA Berlin  77–62 (60–61)  Le Mans. ALBA Berlin win 137–123 on aggregate.
Maroussi  89–60 (67–69)  Aris Salonica. Maroussi win 156–129 on aggregate.

Cricket
ICC Champions Trophy in South Africa:
1st Semi-Final at Centurion:
 257 (47.4 ov);  258/1 (41.5 ov, Shane Watson 136*, Ricky Ponting 111*). Australia win by 9 wickets.

Football (soccer)
U-20 World Cup in Egypt: (teams in bold advance to the round of 16)
Group C:
 3–0 
 3–0  United States
Final standings: Germany 7 points, South Korea 4, United States, Cameroon 3.
Group D:
 2–2 
 1–1 
Final standings: Ghana, Uruguay 7 points, Uzbekistan, England 1.
As a result of the score in Uzbekistan–England match,  advance as one of four best 3rd place teams.

Olympic Games
Rio de Janeiro is elected as the host city of 2016 Summer Olympics by the IOC session in Copenhagen, and becomes the first ever city in South America to stage the Olympic Games. Rio de Janeiro beat Madrid by 66 votes to 32 in the third round of voting, after Chicago and Tokyo were eliminated in earlier rounds.

Rugby league
Super League play-offs:
Qualifying Semi-Final 1:
Leeds Rhinos  27–20  Catalans Dragons
2-times defending champions Leeds Rhinos advance to the Grand Final for the third straight year.

Volleyball
Asian Men's Championship in Manila, Philippines: (teams in bold advance to the semifinals)
Pool E:
 0–3 
 3–1 
Standings: Iran 4 points, China, Kazakhstan 3, Chinese Taipei 2.
Pool F:
 3–0 
 3–0 
Standings: Japan, South Korea 4 points, Australia, Indonesia 2.
South American Women's Championship in Porto Alegre, Brazil: (teams in bold advance to the semifinals)
Pool A:
 3–1 
 3–0 
Final standings: Brazil 6 points, Argentina 5, Uruguay 4, Paraguay 3.
Pool B:
 3–0 
 3–0 
Final standings: Peru 6 points, Colombia 5, Venezuela 4, Chile 3.

October 1, 2009 (Thursday)

Baseball
Major League Baseball (teams in bold have clinched division title, teams in italics have clinched at least a wild card berth):
American League:
Minnesota Twins 8, Detroit Tigers 3
The Twins stay alive in the Central Division race, while the Tigers' magic number remains at 2.
National League:
Colorado Rockies 9, Milwaukee Brewers 2
The Rockies clinch at least a wild card berth and draw within 2 games of the idle Los Angeles Dodgers in the West Division.
Houston Astros 5, Philadelphia Phillies 3
St. Louis Cardinals 13, Cincinnati Reds 0
Starting pitcher Chris Carpenter hits a grand slam and drives in six runs in addition to picking up the win. The Cards are now 2 games behind the Dodgers and 1 game behind the Phillies in the race for the League's best record.

Basketball
WNBA Finals:
Game 2 at Phoenix: (E1) Indiana Fever 93, (W1) Phoenix Mercury 84. Best-of-5 series tied 1–1.

Football (soccer)
U-20 World Cup in Egypt: (teams in bold advance to the round of 16)
Group A:
 0–0 
 2–4 
Final standings: Egypt 6 points, Paraguay 5, Italy 4, Trinidad and Tobago 1.
Group B:
 0–3 
 0–5 
Standings: Spain 9 points, Venezuela 6, Nigeria 3, Tahiti 0.
Tahiti concede 21 goals in their 3 matches.
UEFA Europa League group stage, Matchday 2:
Group A:
Anderlecht  1–1  Ajax
Timişoara  0–3  Dinamo Zagreb
Group B:
Slavia Prague  1–5  Lille
Valencia  3–2  Genoa
Group C:
Hamburg  4–2  Hapoel Tel Aviv
Celtic  1–1  Rapid Wien
Group D:
Sporting CP  1–0  Hertha BSC
Ventspils  0–0  Heerenveen
Group E:
Roma  2–0  CSKA Sofia
Fulham  1–0  Basel
Group F:
Dinamo București  0–1  Panathinaikos
Galatasaray  1–1  Sturm Graz
Group G:
Levski Sofia  0–4  Lazio
Red Bull Salzburg  2–0  Villarreal
Group H:
Twente  0–0  Steaua București
Sheriff Tiraspol  0–1  Fenerbahçe
Group I:
AEK Athens  1–0  Benfica
BATE Borisov  1–2  Everton
Group J:
Toulouse  2–2  Club Brugge
Shakhtar Donetsk  4–1  Partizan
Group K:
Copenhagen  1–0  Sparta Prague
PSV Eindhoven  1–0  CFR Cluj
Group L:
Werder Bremen  3–1  Athletic Bilbao
Austria Wien  1–1  Nacional
Copa Sudamericana Round of 16, second leg: (first leg score in parentheses)
Goiás  3–1 (0–2)  Cerro Porteño. 3–3 on aggregate, Cerro Porteño advance on away goals.
Lanús  1–1 (0–4)  LDU Quito. LDU Quito win 5–1 on aggregate.
Unión Española  2–2 (2–3)  Vélez Sarsfield. Vélez Sarsfield win 5–4 on aggregate.
Fluminense  4–1 (2–2)  Alianza Atlético. Fluminense win 6–3 on aggregate.
CONCACAF Champions League Group Stage, round 5: (teams in bold advance to the quarterfinals)
Group B:
Marathón  2–0  Toluca
Standings: Toluca 12 points, D.C. United, Marathón 9, San Juan Jabloteh 0.

Ice hockey
National Hockey League season opening games:
Washington Capitals 4, Boston Bruins 1
 Two-time defending Hart Trophy winner Alex Ovechkin starts the season with two goals and an assist.
Montreal Canadiens 4, Toronto Maple Leafs 3 (OT)
Calgary Flames 5, Vancouver Canucks 3
Colorado Avalanche 5, San Jose Sharks 2
 The Avs retire the number of Joe Sakic before the game and cruise to an easy win.

Snooker
Premier League Snooker – League phase in Colchester, Essex:
Marco Fu  2–4 Judd Trump 
Ronnie O'Sullivan  3–3 Neil Robertson 
Standings: Judd Trump 4 points; John Higgins, Ronnie O'Sullivan, Neil Robertson 3; Stephen Hendry 2; Marco Fu 1; Shaun Murphy 0.

Volleyball
European Women's Championship in Poland: (teams in bold advance to the semifinals)
Pool E in Łódź:
 3–2 
 3–2 
 3–1 
Final standings: Netherlands 10 points, Poland 9, Russia 8, Bulgaria 7, Spain 6, Belgium 5.
Pool F in Katowice:
 3–0 
 3–0 
 3–0 
Final standings: Italy 10 points, Germany 9, Turkey 8, Serbia 7, Czech Republic 6, Azerbaijan 5.
Asian Men's Championship in Manila, Philippines: (teams in bold advance to the second round)
Pool A:
 3–1 
 1–3 
Final standings: Kazakhstan 6 points, Chinese Taipei 5, Myanmar 4, Philippines 3.
Pool B:
 0–3 
Final standings: Japan 6 points, Indonesia 5, India 4, Thailand 3.
Pool C:
 3–0 
 0–3 
Final standings: Iran 8 points, China 7, Vietnam 6, Sri Lanka 5, Hong Kong 4.
Pool D:
 0–3 
 1–3 
Final standings: South Korea 8 points, Australia 7, Lebanon 6, Qatar 5, Maldives 4.
South American Women's Championship in Porto Alegre, Brazil: (teams in bold advance to the semifinals)
Pool A:
 3–0 
 3–0 
Standings: Brazil, Argentina 4 points, Uruguay, Paraguay 2.
Pool B:
 3–0 
 3–1 
Standings: Peru 4 points, Venezuela, Colombia 3, Chile 2.
African Men's Championship in Tétouan, Morocco: (teams in bold advance to the semifinals)
Group A:
 3–2 
Final standings: Cameroon, Morocco, Libya 5 points, South Africa 3.
Group B:
 3–0 
 0–3 
Final standings: Egypt 8 points, Algeria 7, Tunisia 6, Botswana 5, Gabon 4.

References

X